= Speak of the Devil (disambiguation) =

Speak of the devil is an English idiom.

Speak of the Devil may also refer to:

- Speak of the Devil (Ozzy Osbourne album), a 1982 live album
- Speak of the Devil (1989 film), a movie directed by Raphael Nussbaum
- Speak of the Devil (1993 film), a documentary film directed by Nick Bougas
- Speak of the Devil (John Abercrombie album), 1993
- Speak of the Devil (Chris Isaak album), 1998
- Speak of the Devil (book), a 1998 investigation of allegations of satanic ritual abuse in England by anthropologist Jean LaFontaine
- "Speak of the Devil" (song), 1991 country song recorded by Pirates of the Mississippi
- "Speak of the Devil" (Under the Dome),
- "Speak of the Devil" (Daredevil), a season one episode of Daredevil
- Speak of the Devil, a collegiate a cappella group at Duke University

== See also ==
- Talk of the devil (disambiguation)
