= Walter Kutschera =

Austrian physicist

- Born: 1939 (age 86–87); Vienna, Austria
- Education: University of Graz
- Known for: Vienna Environmental Research Accelerator
- Awards: Erwin Schrödinger Prize
- Scientific career
- Fields: Physics
- Workplaces: University of Tokyo; Weizmann Institute of Science; Hebrew University of Jerusalem; University of Vienna

Walter Kutschera (born 1939) is an Austrian physicist.

== Biography ==
Kutschera was born in Vienna, Austria in 1939. In 1965 he got his Ph.D. in experimental physics from the Austrian University of Graz. Starting from next year and for the whole 27 after, he was working in different institutions researching nuclear physics, majority of which had to do with tandem accelerators. In 1978 he taught Experimental physics at University of Tokyo in Tokyo, Japan for one year, followed by 14 years of work at Argonne National Laboratory in Chicago. In 1980 he focused his research on the study of isotope language. He became Senior Scientist in 1986, in the end of his teachings in Illinois. Later, he worked at Weizmann Institute of Science in Rehovot, and accepted an invitation to Jerusalem, Israel for one year, where he taught at Racah Institute of Physics, a division of the Hebrew University. From 1993 to 2007 he worked as Professor of Physics at the University of Vienna and was a head of Isotope Research and Nuclear Physics.

He founded Vienna Environmental Research Accelerator, a universal facility which operates since 1996 and is a part of Accelerator mass spectrometry. The construction was based on 3-MV model of pelletron tandem accelerator, which was one of his key interests. In 1999 he became the president of the Austrian Physical Society, but had it only for one year. Four years later he became the Dean of Faculty of Physics in University of Vienna, and 2 years later became its Vice-Dean. The same year he was awarded with a Decoration of Honour for Services to the Republic of Austria. In 2008 he was promoted to Emeritus Professor of Physics. In 2010 he was awarded by Austrian Academy of Sciences with an Erwin Schrödinger Prize, and a year later he became a Fellow of the American Association award for the Advancement of Science. Besides physics, his other researched include works in archaeology, art, atmospheric science, atomic and molecular physics, biomedicine, environmental physics, forensic medicine, Egyptology, geochronology, geomorphology, geophysics, glaciology, groundwater dating, nuclear astrophysics, nuclear physics, oceanography, and paleoclimatology.

== Works ==
Starting from 2004 he has written three works and was a co-author of many others: Author:

- 2004 — Tracing Noble Gas Radionuclides in the Environment
- 2008 — A homage to ECAART-9 and Florence
- 2010 — AMS and Climate Change

Co-author:

- 2004 — VERA, an AMS Facility for "all" Isotopes
- 2004 — Direct Dating of Early Upper Palaeolithic Human Remains from Mladec
- 2005 — Progress in isotope analysis at ultra-trace level by AMS
- 2005 — AMS Radiocarbon Dating of Bone Samples from the Xinzhai Site in China
- 2005 — Experimental and Theoretical Evidence for Long-Lived Molecular Hydrogen Anions H2 and D2
- 2006 — Radiocarbon Determination of Particulate Organic Carbon in Non-Temperated, Alpine Glacier Ice
- 2006 — Chronology for the Aegean Late Bronze Age
- 2007 — Exotic Negative Molecules in AMS
- 2007 — Radiocarbon Dating of the Peruvian Chachapoya/Inca Site at the Laguna de los Condores
- 2008 — PIXE measurements of renaissance silverpoint drawings at VERA
- 2009 — Dating the Santorini/Thera Eruption by Radiocarbon: Further Discussion (AD 2006-2007)
- 2010 — Search for a Superheavy Nuclide with A=292 and Neutron-Deficient Thorium Isotopes in Natural Thorianite
- 2011 — Upper Limits for the Existence of Long-Lived Isotopes of Roentgenium in Natural Gold
- 2011 — Ultrasensitive Search for Long-Lived Superheavy Nuclides in the Mass Range A = 288 to A = 300 in Natural Pt, Pb, and Bi
- 2012 — The Age of Olfactory Bulb Neurons in Humans
