= List of accelerator mass spectrometry facilities =

The following list of accelerator mass spectrometry facilities includes research centers that employ accelerator mass spectrometry (AMS).

Accelerator mass spectrometry is a form of mass spectrometry that accelerates ions to extraordinarily high kinetic energies before mass analysis.

== Facilities ==
=== Africa ===
- iThemba Laboratory for Accelerator Based Sciences, Johannesburg, South Africa

=== Oceania ===
- 14UD The Australian National University, Canberra, Australia
- SSAMS The Australian National University, Canberra, Australia
- ANTARES 10MV, STAR 2MV, Sydney, Australia
- Rafter Radiocarbon Laboratory, GNS Science, New Zealand
- Chronos 14Carbon-Cycle Facility, UNSW, Australia.

=== North America ===
- Accium BioSciences at Swedish Medical Center Cherry Hill, Seattle, WA
- André E. Lalonde Accelerator Mass Spectrometry Laboratory (AEL AMS) at the University of Ottawa in Ottawa, Canada
- Beta Analytic Accelerator Mass Spectrometry Facility in Miami, Florida
- Center for Accelerator Mass Spectrometry (CAMS) at the Lawrence Livermore National Laboratory
- Center for Applied Isotope Studies (CAIS) at University of Georgia.
- DirectAMS (D-AMS) radiocarbon labs in Bothell, WA & Seattle, WA
- Facility for Rare Isotope Beams, Michigan State University, East Lansing, Michigan
- Institute for Structure and Nuclear Astrophysics, The University of Notre Dame, Notre Dame, Indiana
- Institute of Energy and the Environment Radiocarbon Laboratory at the Pennsylvania State University, University Park, Pennsylvania
- MegaSIMS at the University of California, Los Angeles in Los Angeles, CA
- National Ocean Sciences Accelerator Mass Spectrometry (NOSAMS) Facility at Woods Hole Oceanographic Institution
- NSF - Arizona Accelerator Mass Spectrometry (AMS) Laboratory
- Pharmaron ABS, Inc. in Germantown, Maryland
- Purdue Rare Isotope Measurement Laboratory at Purdue University in West Lafayette, Indiana
- Trace Element Accelerator Mass Spectrometer (TEAMS) at the Naval Research Laboratory in Washington, DC
- W.M. Keck Carbon Cycle Accelerator Mass Spectrometry (KCCAMS) Facility at the University of California, Irvine

=== Asia ===
- Inter University Accelerator Centre (IUAC), New Delhi 110067 .
- Xi'an AMS Center, China
- Tandem accelerator for Environmental Research and Radiocarbon Analysis (NIES-TERRA) of the National Institute for Environmental Studies (NIES), Tsukuba, Japan
- BINP AMS Facility, Novosibirsk, Russia
- National Taiwan University, Department of Geosciences, Taipei, Taiwan
- Accelerator Unit for Radio isotope Studies (AURiS), Geoscience Division, Physical Research Laboratory, Ahmedabad, India.
- China Institute for Radiation Protection, Taiyuan, China
- Laboratory of AMS Dating and the Environment, Nanjing University, China

=== Europe ===
- Lancaster AMS-UK for trace actinides and radiocarbon at Lancaster University, England
- Vilnius Radiocarbon AMS dating laboratory in Vilnius, Lithuania
- Centre for Isotope Research on Cultural and Environmental heritage (CIRCE) , Mathematics and Physics Department , Università degli Studi della Campania "Luigi Vanvitelli", Caserta, Italy
- CEREGE in Aix en Provence, France
- LMC14 Laboratoire de mesure du carbone 14, at LSCE, Saclay, France
- LSCE-ECHoMICADAS, at LSCE, Gif-sur-Yvette, France
- 14Chrono Centre for Climate, the Environment, and Chronology Queen's University Belfast, Northern Ireland
- Bristol Radiocarbon Accelerator Mass Spectrometer at University of Bristol, England
- RICH, Royal Institute for Cultural heritage, Brussels, Belgium
- CologneAMS at University of Cologne, Germany
- Hertelendi Laboratory of Environmental Studies at ATOMKI, Debrecen, Hungary
- DREAMS at Dresden, Germany
- Centre for Isotope Research Rijksuniversiteit Groningen, The Netherlands
- Beta Analytic Europe in London, England
- Tandem Laboratory at Uppsala University in Uppsala, Sweden
- Lund Accelerator Mass Spectrometry Facility at Lund University, Sweden
- RoAMS Laboratory of the "Horia Hulubei" National Institute for Physics and Nuclear Engineering Măgurele, Romania
- AMS at the Maier-Leibnitz-Laboratory joint facility of LMU Munich and Technical University of Munich, Germany
- Oxford Radiocarbon Accelerator Unit, University of Oxford, United Kingdom
- Poznan Radiocarbon Laboratory, Poland
- Centre for Dating and Diagnostics (CEDAD), University of Salento, Italy
- Centro Nacional de Aceleradores, CNA University of Sevilla, Spain
- NERC Recognised Accelerator Mass Spectrometer at SUERC, Scotland
- Vienna Environmental Research Accelerator at the University of Vienna, Austria
- Ion Beam Physics Laboratory of the ETH Zurich and the Paul Scherrer Institute, Switzerland
- National 1MV AMS Laboratory, TÜBİTAK Marmara Research Center Turkey
- Nuclear Physics Institute, The Czech Academy of Sciences, Czech Republic

== Closed Facilities ==
- Eckert & Ziegler Vitalea Science AMS company based in Davis, California, closed in 2016.
