= André E. Lalonde Accelerator Mass Spectrometry Laboratory =

Research facility at the University of Ottawa in Canada

Coordinates: 45.4207°N 75.6787°W

The André E. Lalonde Accelerator Mass Spectrometry Laboratory is an accelerator mass spectrometry research facility at the University of Ottawa in Canada. It is currently the only facility of its type in Canada. It is named after former University of Ottawa Faculty of Science dean André E. Lalonde, who died in 2012.

== History ==
The facility was created by 2014, with funding from the Canada Foundation for Innovation and the Ontario Research Fund. It is located in the University of Ottawa's Advanced Research Complex. It replaced the IsoTrace facility at the University of Toronto and cost around 10 million dollars.

In 2017, the laboratory will host the 14th annual Accelerator Mass Spectrometry conference.

== Equipment ==
The facility has a custom-made 3 mega-volt tandem accelerator mass spectrometer. It also has a 200 sample ion source, a high resolution, 120° injection magnet, a 90° high energy analysis magnet (mass-energy product 350 MeV-AMU), a 65°, 1.7 m radius electric analyzer and a 2 channel gas ionization detector. The spectrometer weighs around 44 tons and is around 25 metres long. The facility can be seen through a two-storey window in the lobby of the Advanced Research Complex.

The spectrometer accelerates the isotopes to a very high speed with almost no contamination, thus allowing for the detection of trace isotopes at very low levels.

== Personnel ==
The executive committee of the facility is composed of three University of Ottawa professors: William Kieser and Ian Clark.

== See also ==
- List of accelerator mass spectrometry facilities
- University of Ottawa
