= Fontbrégoua Cave =

Cave and archaeological site in southern France

- Map of Fontbrégoua Cave interior

- Location of Fontbrégoua Cave
- 43.55°N 6.2333°E
- Location: Provence, France

Fontbrégoua Cave is an archaeological site located in Provence, Southeastern France. It was used by humans in the fifth and fourth millennia BCE, in what is now known as the Early and Middle Neolithic. A temporary residential site, it was used by Neolithic agriculturalists as a storage area for their herds of goats and sheep, and also contained a number of bone depositions, containing the remains of domestic species, wild animals, and humans. The inclusion of the latter of these deposits led the archaeological team studying the site to propose that cannibalism had taken place at Fontbrégoua, although other archaeologists have instead suggested that they represent evidence of secondary burial.

The original excavators of the site, under the leadership of Paola Villa, argued that the treatment of human remains at the site constituted strong evidence of cannibalism. This conclusion was criticised by M.P. Pickering, who instead suggested that the evidence was better explained by defleshing rituals involved in secondary burial, drawing ethnographic comparisons with certain Indigenous Australian practices. Pickering's views were supported by the archaeologist Paul Bahn, but in turn came under counter-criticisms from Villa.

== Location and context ==
The cave is located in the south-east of France, approximately 100 km away from Marseille and the Mediterranean coast.

In Provence and Liguria during the Impresso-Cardial period (c. 6th millennium BCE), rock shelters and caves were usually used as seasonal herding and hunting locations. It has thus been suggested that Fontbrégoua and other similar caves were seasonal shelters located some distance from the open-air villages which were at the centre of a community's territory.

== Layout ==
The cave is large and well-lit, allowing easy access inside. It is elevated at 400 metres above sea level and is located 30 metres above a fresh-water spring. Archaeologists investigating the site decided to divide the cave into three distinct areas: the porch, the main room, and the lower room, with skeletal and material finds being uncovered in each area.

The cave was occupied by humans from the Upper Palaeolithic period through to the end of the Neolithic. From the stratigraphic and cultural evidence, archaeologists suggested that the cave was used as a temporary residential camp for the local agricultural population during the 5th and 4th millennia BCE. The Neolithic people who lived in the region sometimes used the cave for storing their herds of goat and sheep, as evidenced by layers of burnt ovicaprine faeces. These people had access to domestic cereals, pottery, personal ornaments and lithic tools made out on non-local flint. From the evidence in the cave, archaeologists argued that over this period, there was a transformation in the subsistence of the local population; in the Early Neolithic, it appeared that they were making use of hunting and herding in equal part, but that by the Middle Neolithic they had placed a far greater emphasis on the herding of sheep and goats, with hunting playing only a minor role.

== Human remains ==
The site at the cave is well known for the human remains that were found there. These include the remains of seven adults, six children, one individual of indeterminate age, as well as the cranial and post-cranial remains of at least seven further humans. No information on the sex of these individuals has been ascertained. Examination of stable isotopes in these bones suggested that they all had a similar diet, with terrestrial animals having been the major source of protein.

Collagen extracted from the bones by archaeologists was dated through accelerator mass spectrometry. This revealed that not all of the human burials were contemporary with each other, but rather had been placed into the cave at various intervals over a long period of time.

=== Cannibalism debate ===
The team who originally excavated at the site published a 1986 paper in the journal Science entitled "Cannibalism in the Neolithic." They argued that the bone evidence from the human remains at Fontbrégoua was consistent with a situation in which these humans were "butchered, processed, and probably eaten" in a manner that closely paralleled the treatment of both wild and domesticated animals at the site.

The case for cannibalism was disputed by the archaeologist Michael P. Pickering in a 1989 paper published in Australian Archaeology. He considered it "more likely" that the remains were the result of a mortuary rite in which the corpses were left to decompose before being de-fleshed and then buried. He highlighted ethnographic parallels with the mortuary practices of some Indigenous Australian societies, although stressed that he was not arguing for direct analogy between the Indigenous Australians of the 20th century and the people of Neolithic France. Discussing the ethnographic accounts of W.E. Roth undertaken in North Queensland during the early 20th century in which corpses were left in trees or on platforms to decompose before burial, he also highlights those produced by A. McDonald in the 1870s in which Indigenous communities were recorded de-fleshing the bones prior to burial. Pickering argues that this method would leave very similar traces on the remains to those uncovered at Fontbrégoua. Although he does not rule out cannibalism as a possibility at the site, he did maintain that it was only one possibility, with de-fleshed secondary burials being another. Pickering was supported in his hypothesis by the European prehistorian Paul Bahn, who published a short one-page article in the journal Nature in 1990, in which he proclaimed that the case for cannibalism at Fontbrégoua must be considered "not proven."

In a 1992 paper published in the Evolutionary Anthropology journal, Villa critiqued Pickering's ideas, reiterating her position that the remains at the site represented "the only well-documented case of cannibalism in European prehistory". Rejecting Pickering's claims, she remarks that secondary burial does not represent a "meaningful alternative" to cannibalism, which remained the "simplest and most satisfactory explanation" for the evidence found in the cave. She argues that had this been a case of secondary burial, then the human remains would not have been treated exactly the same as the animal remains, as they had been. She then notes that the concept of secondary burial is not innately more plausible than cannibalism in this scenario because there is no known tradition of secondary burial anywhere else in Europe. Villa also questions the accuracy of the ethnographic accounts that Pickering draws on, noting that several of them actually believed that the Australian mortuary practices that they described constituted evidence for cannibalism. Commenting on the site in 1992, the archaeologist Tim White described it as exhibiting "excellent" evidence of cannibalism.

== Archaeological investigation ==
The cave was excavated by André Taxil between 1948 and 1960 and then by Jean Courtin during the 1970s.

== See also ==
- Herxheim (archaeological site), another noted Neolithic site with evidence of cannibalism
