= Massacre of Schletz =

Neolithic event in modern Austria

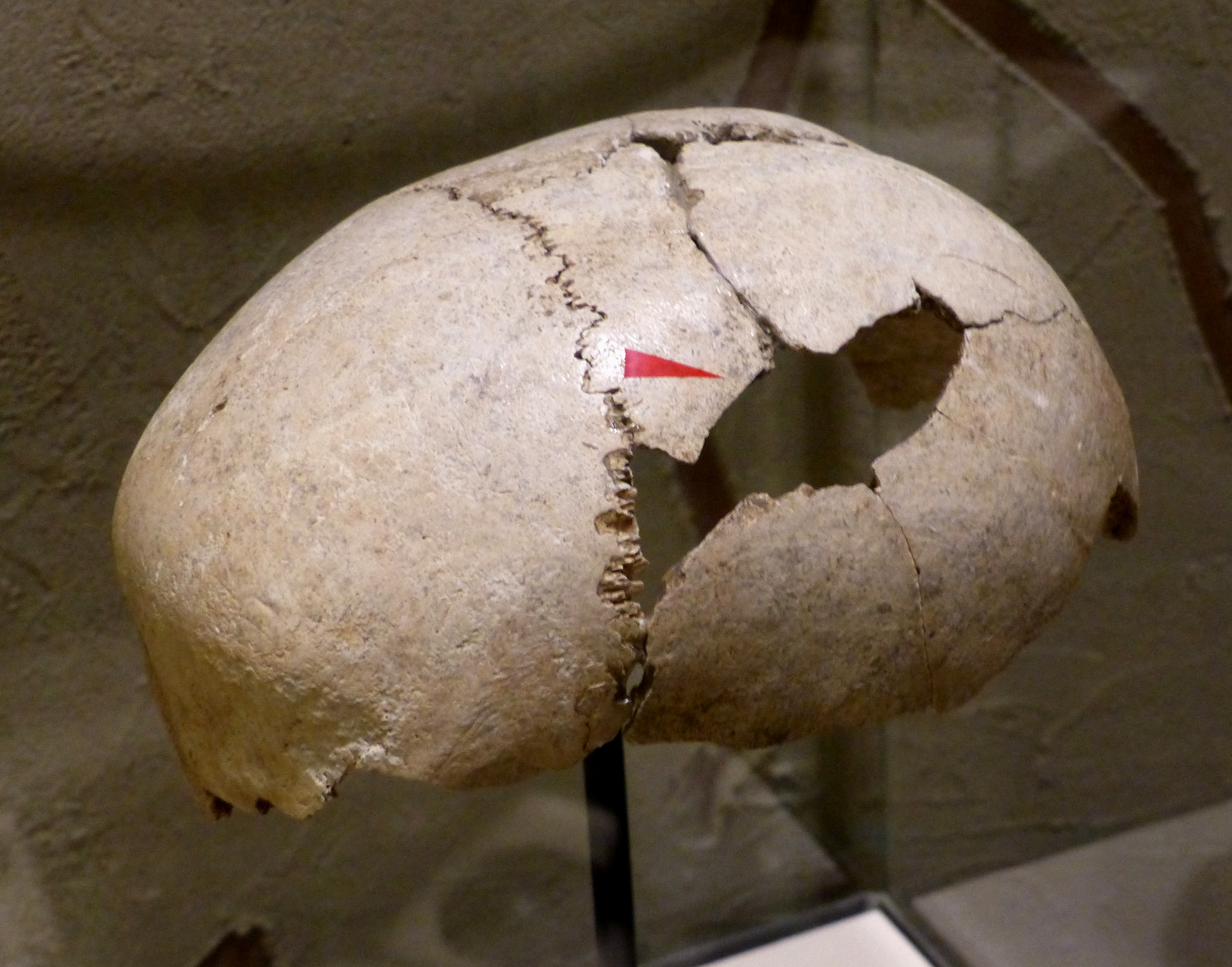
- Victim of the massacre: skull of a 40- to 50-year-old woman
- Location: now Schletz, Austria
- Date: c. 5000 BC
- Attack type: Mass murder, assault
- Deaths: 200
- Perpetrator: unknown

In the Massacre of Schletz, more than 200 Neolithic people were killed by blunt force around 5000 BC, towards the end of the Linear Pottery culture epoch, before being dumped in a mass grave on the site of the present-day village of Schletz (in the municipality of Asparn an der Zaya in Lower Austria).

== Excavation ==
The Linear Pottery settlement area of Schletz, about 50 kilometers north of Vienna, was discovered on the basis of aerial archaeological features and archaeologically investigated between 1983 and 2005. The settlement was enclosed by an oval ditch, which was double in sections and can be interpreted as a fortification. The oval ditch had a width of up to four meters, a depth of two meters, and a longitudinal diameter of 330 meters. Several earth bridges provided access to the interior of the settlement, where the ground plans of at least 12 longhouses have been traced.

== Findings ==
In the course of the excavations, which covered about 20 percent of the site, the skeletons of about 200 individuals were discovered in the outer trench, most of whom died from severe injuries to their skulls caused by blunt force (with shoe-last celts), and in one case also by arrow shot. The trenches remained open for some time, so the positions of some corpses were altered by animals. The dead – men, women and children – were mostly laid in prone position; many were missing arms or legs, and severed skulls were found separately. There were hardly any young women among the dead. All inhabitants were likely killed or captured during an attack on the settlement; after that the settlement area was no longer inhabited.

According to the findings, all the dead were laid down around 5000 BC. The massacre of Schletz consequently occurred around the same time as the massacres at Kilianstädten (Hesse) and Talheim (Baden-Württemberg).
