= Talk of the devil (disambiguation) =

"Talk of the devil" is an idiom synonymous to "Speak of the devil".

Talk of the devil may also refer to:

- Talk of the Devil, a 1936 British crime film
- Speak of the Devil (Ozzy Osbourne album), released as Talk of the Devil in England
- Talk of the Devil, an album by Master
- "Talk of the Devil", a 1984 song by Larry Wallistitle on Previously Unreleased
- Rozmowy z diabłem, a 1965 book by Leszek Kołakowski, released a Talk of the Devil in the UK

== See also ==
- Speak of the Devil (disambiguation)
