= Raptio =

Latin term for the large-scale abduction of women

Raptio (in archaic or literary English rendered as rape) is a Latin term for, among several other meanings for senses of "taking", the large-scale abduction of women: kidnapping for marriage, concubinage or sexual slavery. The equivalent German term is Frauenraub (literally woman robbery).

Bride kidnapping is distinguished from raptio in that the former is the abduction of one woman by one man (and his friends and relatives), whereas the latter is the abduction of many women by groups of men, possibly in a time of war.

== Terminology ==
The English word rape retains the Latin meaning in literary language, but the meaning is obscured by the more current meaning of "sexual violation". The word is akin to rapine, rapture, raptor, rapacious and ravish, and referred to the more general violations, such as looting, destruction, and capture of citizens, that are inflicted upon a town or country during war, e.g. the Rape of Nanking. The Oxford English Dictionary gives the definition "the act of carrying away a person, especially a woman, by force" besides the more general "the act of taking anything by force" (marked as obsolete) and the more specific "violation or ravishing of a woman".

English rape was in use since the 14th century in the general sense of "seize prey, take by force", from raper, an Old French legal term for "to seize", in turn from Latin rapere "seize, carry off by force, abduct". The Latin term was also used for sexual violation, but not always. It is contested that the legendary event known as "The Rape of the Sabine Women", while ultimately motivated sexually, did not entail sexual violation of the Sabine women on the spot, who were instead abducted, and then implored by the Romans to marry them (as opposed to striking a deal with their fathers or brothers first, as would have been required by law).

Though the sexual connotation is today dominant, the word "rape" can be used in a non-sexual context in literary English. In Alexander Pope's The Rape of the Lock, the title means "the theft of a lock [of hair]", exaggerating a trivial violation against a person. In the twentieth century, the classically trained J. R. R. Tolkien used the word with its old meaning of "seizing and taking away" in his The Silmarillion. The musical comedy The Fantasticks has a controversial song ("It Depends on What You Pay") about "an old-fashioned rape". Compare also the adjective "rapacious" which retains the generic meaning of greedy and grasping.

In Roman Catholic canon law, raptio refers to the legal prohibition of matrimony if the bride was abducted forcibly (Canon 1089 , 1983 CIC).

== History ==
The practice is surmised to have been common since anthropological antiquity. An excavation of the Neolithic Linear Pottery culture site at Asparn-Schletz, Austria, revealed the remains of numerous slain victims. Among them, young women and children were clearly under-represented, suggesting that attackers had killed the men but abducted the nubile women. Investigation of the Neolithic skeletons found in the Talheim Death Pit suggests that prehistoric men from neighboring tribes were prepared to fight and kill each other to capture and secure women.

Abduction of women is a common practice in warfare among tribal societies, along with cattle raiding. In historical human migrations, the tendency of mobile groups of invading males to abduct indigenous females is reflected in the greater stability of Human mitochondrial DNA haplogroups compared to Human Y-chromosome DNA haplogroups.

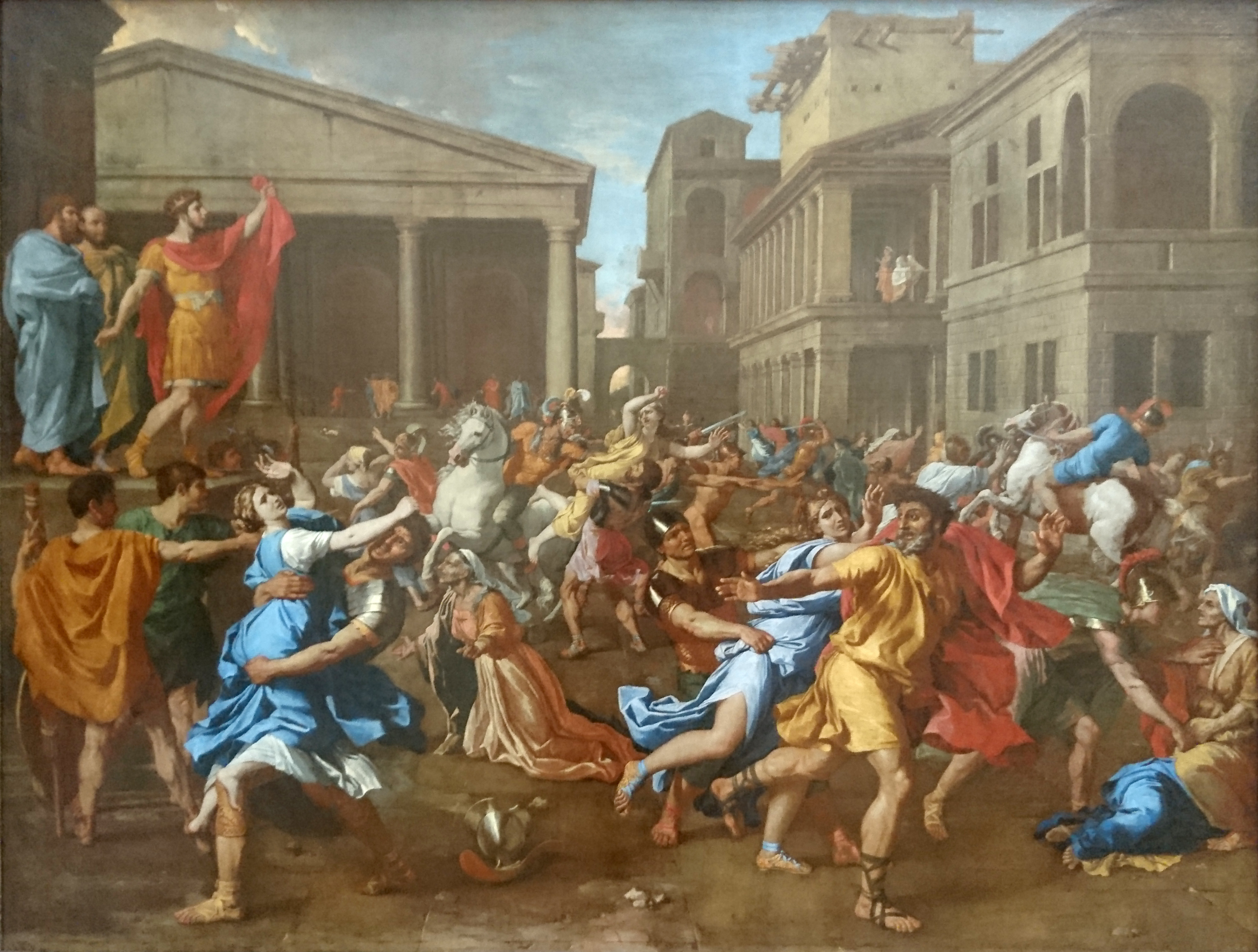
Rape of the Sabine Women, by Nicolas Poussin, Rome, 1637–38 (Louvre Museum)

The Rape of the Sabine Women is an important part of the foundation legends of Rome (8th century BC). Romulus had established the settlement on the Palatine Hill with mostly male followers. Seeking wives, the Romans negotiated with the neighboring tribe of the Sabines, without success. Faced with the extinction of their community, the Romans planned to abduct Sabine women. Romulus invited Sabine families to a festival of Neptune Equester. At the meeting he gave a signal, at which the Romans grabbed the Sabine women and fought off the Sabine men. The indignant abductees were implored by Romulus to accept Roman husbands. Livy claims that no sexual assault took place. He asserted that Romulus offered them free choice and promised civil and property rights to women. According to Livy he spoke to them each in person, "and pointed out to them that it was all owing to the pride of their parents in denying right of intermarriage to their neighbours. They would live in honourable wedlock, and share all their property and civil rights, and—dearest of all to human nature—would be the mothers of free men." The women married Roman men, but the Sabines went to war with the Romans. The conflict was eventually resolved when the women, who now had children by their Roman husbands, intervened in a battle to reconcile the warring parties. The tale is parodied by English short-story writer Saki in The Schartz-Metterklume Method. It also serves as the main plot of the movie Seven Brides for Seven Brothers.

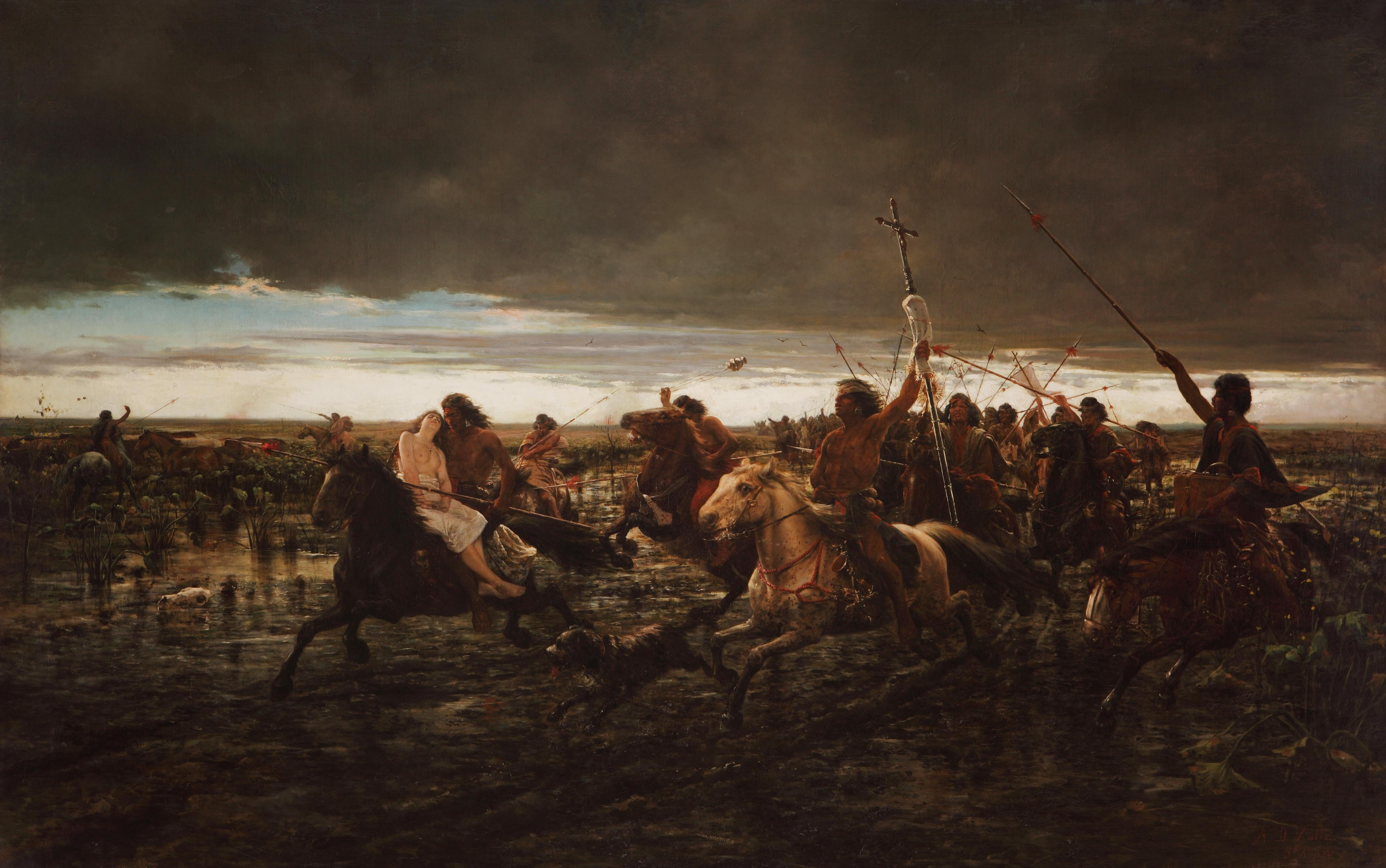
Mapuches kidnapping a woman during a malón raid as shown in La vuelta del malón (The return of the raiders) by Ángel Della Valle (1892).

In Sanskrit literature, the practice is known as Rakshasa Vivaha ("marriage by abduction, devil's marriage"), mentioned e.g. by Kautilya. It is one of the eight forms of marriage and, even in ancient texts, such practice was viewed unfavorably.

In the 3rd century, Gothic Christianity appears to have been initiated under the influence of Christian women captured by the Goths in Moesia and Thrace: in 251 AD, the Gothic army raided the Roman provinces of Moesia and Thrace, defeated and killed the Roman emperor Decius, and took a number of (predominantly female) captives, many of whom were Christian. This is assumed to represent the first lasting contact of the Goths with Christianity.

In the Qur'an, marriage to female prisoners of war who embraced Islam is recommended for those who cannot afford to marry other Muslim women according to Islamic law (Sura 4:25). Mutual abduction of women between Christian and Muslim communities was common in the Balkans under Ottoman rule, and is a frequent theme in the Hajduk songs of the period.

Yanoama is a biography of Helena Valero, a mixed-race mestizo woman who was captured in the 1930s as a girl by the Yanomami, an indigenous tribe living in the Amazon rainforest on the border between Venezuela and Brazil. When Yanomami tribes fought and raided nearby tribes, women were often raped and brought back to the shabono to be adopted into the captor's community.

== See also ==
- Disassortative mating
- Elopement
- Endemic warfare
- Exchange of women
- Exogamy
- Genocide of Yazidis by ISIL
- Human mitochondrial genetics
- Human sexual behavior
- Intraspecific competition
- Islam and slavery (disambiguation)
- Operational sex ratio
- Patrilocal residence
- Polygyny
- Sexual conflict
- Sexual selection in human evolution
- Stockholm syndrome
- What your right hands possess
