= Ljubljana Marshes Wheel =

Wooden wheel found in Slovenia in 2002

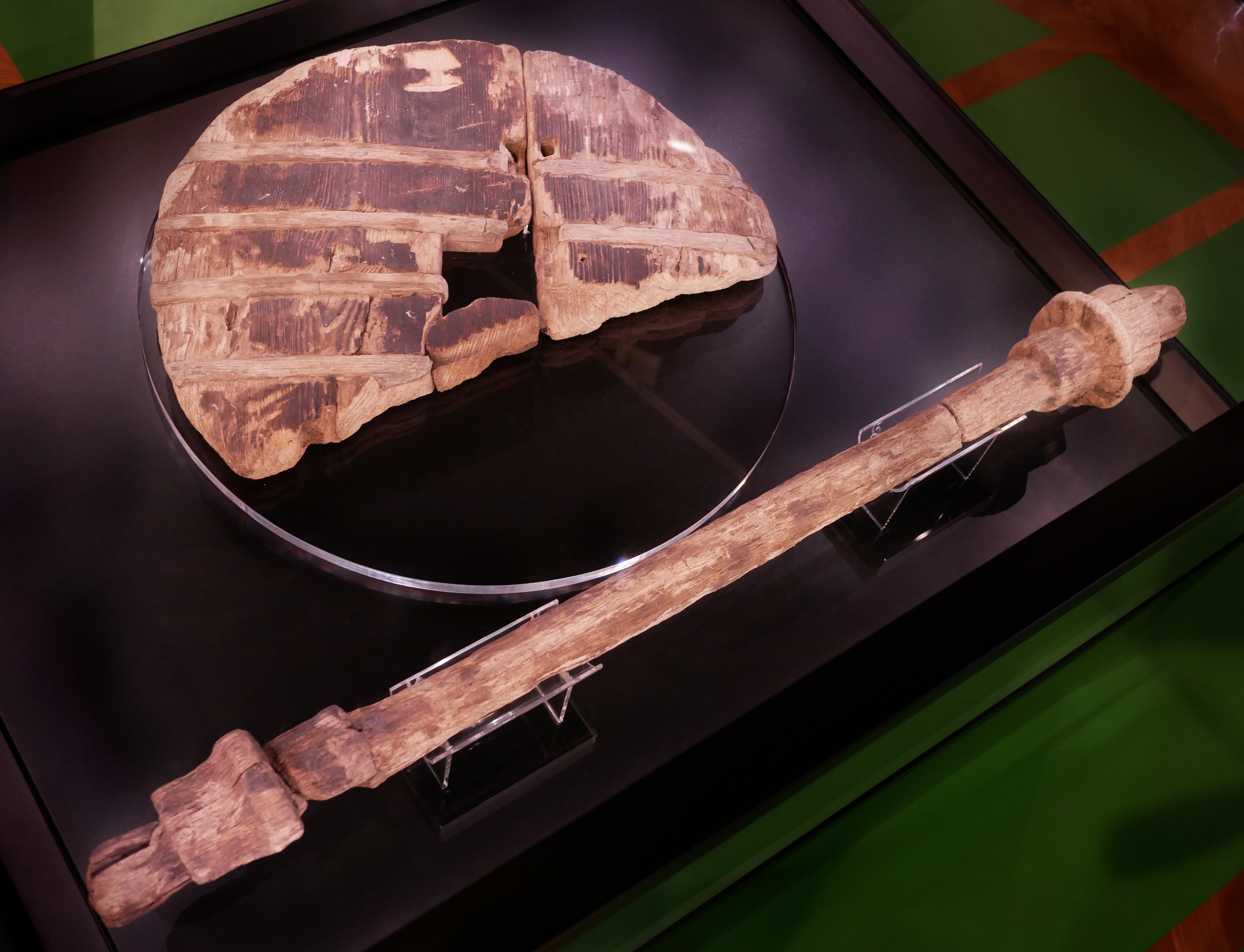
- Having a diameter of 70 centimetres (27 1/2 in), the wheel is made of ash and oak. The aperture for the 120-centimetre-long (47 1/4 in) axle is square, which means that the wheel and the axle rotated together.
- Material: Ash wood
- Created: Chalcolithic (approx. 5,100–5,350 BP)
- Discovered: 2002 in Ljubljana Marsh, Slovenia
- Present location: Ljubljana City Museum, Ljubljana

The Ljubljana Marshes Wheel is a wooden wheel that was found in the Ljubljana Marsh some 20 kilometres (12 mi) south of Ljubljana, the capital of Slovenia, in 2002. Radiocarbon dating, performed in the VERA laboratory (Vienna Environmental Research Accelerator) in Vienna, showed that it was approximately 5,100 to 5,350 years old, which makes it the oldest wooden wheel yet discovered. It was discovered by a team of Slovene archeologists from the Ljubljana Institute of Archaeology, a part of the Research Center at the Slovene Academy of Arts and Sciences, under the guidance of Anton Velušček.

== Archaeological site ==
Remains of pile dwellings were discovered in the Ljubljana Marsh as early as 1875. Since 2011, the site has been protected as a UNESCO World Heritage Site as an example of prehistoric pile dwellings around the Alps, a special form of dwellings in areas with lakes and marshes. The archaeologists at the excavation site identified over one thousand piles in the bed of the Iška River, near Ig. They reconstructed the dwellings of 3.5 by 7 metres (11 ft 6 in × 23 ft 0 in) in size, separated by approximately 2 to 3 metres (6 ft 7 in to 9 ft 10 in). The analyses of the piles revealed that the dwellings were repaired each year and that a new house had to be built on the same place in as little as 10 to 20 years.

The earliest inhabitants settled in the region as early as 9,000 years ago. In the Mesolithic, they built temporary residences on isolated rocks in the marsh and on the fringe, living by hunting and gathering. The permanent settlements were not built until the first farmers appeared approximately 6,000 years ago during the Neolithic.

== The wooden wheel ==
The wooden wheel belonged to a prehistoric two-wheel cart – a pushcart. Similar wheels have been found in the hilly regions of Switzerland and southwest Germany, but the Ljubljana Marshes wheel is bigger and older. It shows that wooden wheels may have appeared almost simultaneously in Mesopotamia and Europe, though finds of actual wheels from Mesopotamia date from significantly later.

It has a diameter of 72 centimetres (28 3/8 in) and is made of ash wood, and its 124-centimetre-long (48 7/8 in) axle is made of oak. The axle was attached to the wheels with oak wood wedges, which meant that the axle rotated together with the wheels. The wheel was made from a tree that grew in the vicinity of the pile dwellings and at the time of the wheel construction was approximately 80 years old.

It appears that the wheel itself is primarily made of two planks of wood which are held together with four cross braces. The cross braces appear to have been held in place simply by a tenon arrangement, the braces being fitted into tenoned slots carved into the two main wheel sections.

== See also ==
- Invention of the wheel
- Prehistoric Europe
- Baden culture
