= Talheim Death Pit =

Neolithic mass grave in Germany

Violence at Talheim
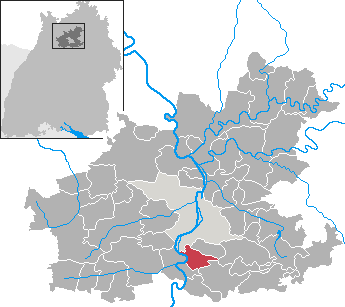
- The town of Talheim, in the state of Baden-Württemberg, Germany.
Date	c. 5000 BC
Location	Talheim, modern-day Germany 49°04′58″N 9°11′10″E
Result	Extralocal victory (suggested)

Belligerents (suggested)
Local forces	Extralocals

Strength
Unknown but more	Unknown, but were outnumbered 4:1

Casualties and losses
16 children and 18 adults killed Unknown number captured	Unknown
- 34 killed

The Talheim Death Pit (German: Massaker von Talheim), discovered in 1983, was a mass grave found in a Linear Pottery Culture settlement, also known as a Linearbandkeramik (LBK) culture. It dates back to about 5000 BC. The pit takes its name from its site in Talheim, Germany. The pit contained the remains of 34 bodies, and evidence points towards the first signs of organized violence in Early Neolithic Europe.

== Evidence of violence ==
Warfare is thought to have been more prevalent in primitive, ungoverned regions than in civilized states. The massacre at Talheim supports this idea by giving evidence of habitual warfare between Linearbandkeramik settlements. It is most likely that the violence occurred among LBK populations since the head wounds indicate the use of weapons from LBK cultures and all skeletons found resemble those of LBK settlers.

The Talheim grave contained a total of 34 skeletons, consisting of 16 children, nine adult men, seven adult women, and two more adults of indeterminate sex. Several skeletons of this group exhibited signs of repeated and healed-over trauma, suggesting that violence was a habitual or routine aspect of the culture. Not all of the wounds, however, were healed at the time of death. All of the skeletons at Talheim showed signs of significant trauma that were likely the cause of death. Broken down into three categories, 18 skulls were marked with wounds indicating the sharp edge of adzes of the Linearbandkeramik or Linear Pottery culture (LBK); 14 skulls were similarly marked with wounds produced from the blunt edge of adzes, and 2–3 had wounds produced by arrows. The skeletons did not exhibit evidence of defensive wounds, indicating that the population was fleeing when it was killed.

== Reasons for violence ==
Investigation of the Neolithic skeletons found in the Talheim death pit suggests that prehistoric men from neighboring tribes were prepared to fight and kill each other in order to capture and secure women. Researchers discovered that there were both men and women among the extralocal skeletons, but within the local group of skeletons there were more men and children than women. It has been theorized that presence of fewer women among the local skeletons meant that they were regarded as somehow special, thus they were captured instead of being killed. The capture of women may have indeed been the primary motive for the fierce conflict between the men.

Other speculations as to the reasons for violence between settlements include vengeance, conflicts over land, resources, poaching, demonstration of superiority, and kidnapping slaves. Some of these theories related to the lack of resources are supported by the discovery that various LBK fortifications bordering indigenously inhabited areas appear to have not been in use for very long.

== Similar occurrences ==
=== Mass burial at Schletz-Asparn ===
The mass grave near Schletz, part of Asparn an der Zaya, was located about 33 kilometres (roughly 20 miles) to the north of Vienna, Austria, and dates back about 7,500 years. Schletz, just like the Talheim death pit, is one of the earliest known sites in the archaeological record that shows proof of genocide in Early Neolithic Europe, among various LBK tribes. The site was not entirely excavated, but it is estimated that the entire ditch could contain up to 300 individuals. The remains of 67 people have been uncovered, all showing multiple points of trauma. Scientists have concluded that these people were also victims of genocide. Since the weapons used were characteristic of LBK peoples, the attackers are believed to be members of other LBK tribes. In similar proportions to those found at Talheim, fewer women were found than men at Schletz. Because of this scarcity of young women among the dead, it is possible that other women of the defeated group were kidnapped by the attackers. The site was enclosed, or fortified, which serves as evidence of violent conflict among tribes and means that these fortifications were built as a form of defense against aggressors. The people who lived there had built two ditches to counter the menace of other LBK communities.

=== Mass burial at Herxheim ===
Another Early Neolithic mass grave was found at Herxheim, near Landau in the Rhineland-Palatinate. The site, unlike the mass burials at Talheim and Schletz, serves as proof of ritual cannibalism rather than of the first signs of violence in Europe.

Herxheim contained 173 skulls and skull-plates, and the scattered remains of at least 450 individuals. Two complete skeletons were found inside the inner ditch. The crania from these bodies were discovered at regular intervals in the two defensive ditches surrounding the site. After the victims were decapitated, their heads were either thrown into the ditch or placed on top of posts that later collapsed inside the ditch. The heads showed signs of trauma from axes and one other weapon. Moreover, the organized placing of the skulls suggests a recurrent ritual act, instead of a single instance. Herxheim also contained various high-quality pottery artifacts and animal bones associated with the human remains. Unlike the mass burial at Talheim, scientists have concluded that instead of being a fortification, Herxheim was an enclosed center for ritual.

=== Mass burial at Schöneck-Kilianstädten ===
This Neolithic mass grave, also in modern-day Germany, may exhibit signs of deliberate mutilation and/or torture. Skeletal analysis of the interred remains showed a remarkably high percentage of long bones (especially in the lower leg) which were broken around the time of the individuals' deaths, which insinuates a deliberate targeting of these areas of the body, possibly as the victims were still alive. The mass grave dates to 5207–4849 BCE, and has been referred to as "indisputable evidence for another massacre".

== Bibliography ==
- Charles Scribner's Sons. (2004). Warfare and Conquest. Retrieved November 10, 2008, from http://www.novelguide.com/a/discover/aneu_01/aneu_01_00030.html
- Gimbutas, M. (1980). "The Transformation of European and Anatolian Culture 4500–2500 B.C. and its Legacy". Journal of Indo-European Studies, 8 (1&2), 1–2.
- Golitko, M. & Keeley, L.H. (2007). "Beating ploughshares back into swords: warfare in the Linearbandkeramik." Antiquity, 81, 332–342.
- Guilaine, Jean; Zammit, Jean (2005). The Origins of War: Violence in Prehistory. Wiley-Blackwell.
- Keeley, L.H. (1996). War Before Civilization. New York: Oxford University. 37, 93.
- Mallory, J.P. (1989). In Search of the Indo-Europeans: Language, Archaeology and Myth. London: Thames & Hudson.
- Orschiedt, J & Haidle, M.N. (2006). "The LBK Enclosure at Herxeim: Theatre of War or Ritual Centre?" Journal of Conflict Archeology, 2.1, 153–167.
- Pavúk, J. (1991) "Lengyel-culture Fortified Settlements in Slovakia." Antiquity, 65, 348–357.
- Robinson, C. A. (2005). "Archeology". In Ciovacco, J. (ed.), Genocide and Crimes Against Humanity. Farmington Hills, MI: Thomas Gale
- Scarre, Chris (2005). The Human Past: World Prehistory and the Development of Human Societies. London: Thames and Hudson.
