= André E. Lalonde =

Canadian geologist

André E. Lalonde (1955–2012) was a Canadian geologist and former dean of the Faculty of Science at the University of Ottawa.

== Early life and education ==
Lalonde was born in Ottawa in 1955. He studied geology at the University of Ottawa, getting his BSc in 1978. He then completed his MSc and PhD at McGill University under Robert F. Martin.

== Career ==
After getting his degree, he took a position at McGill, but soon returned to teach at the University of Ottawa, beginning in 1985. He was known for being a very good teacher, being named teacher of the year by the Faculty of Science on multiple occasions. He was named dean of the Faculty of Science in 2006. As dean, Lalonde lobbied heavily to get the Advanced Research Complex built, and oversaw the hiring of 30 additional professors.

He served as associate editor of Canadian Mineralogist from 2003 to 2006. The mineral lalondite (a phyllosilicate) is named after him.

Lalonde died in 2012 of cancer. The André E. Lalonde Accelerator Mass Spectrometry Laboratory is named after him.
