= Speak of the Devil (book) =

1998 book by J. S. La Fontaine

Speak of the Devil: Tales of Satanic Abuse in Contemporary England
- Author: Jean Sybil La Fontaine
- Language: English
- Subject: Satanic ritual abuse
- Genre: Non-fiction
- Publisher: Cambridge University Press
- Publication date: 1998
- Publication place: United Kingdom
- Pages: 224
- ISBN: 0-521-62934-9
- OCLC: 36548968
- Dewey Decimal: 364.15/554/0941 21
- LC Class: HV6626.54.G7 L3 1998

Speak of the Devil: Tales of Satanic Abuse in Contemporary England is a scholarly book by J. S. La Fontaine published in 1998 that discusses her investigation of allegations of satanic ritual abuse made in the United Kingdom. The book documents a detailed investigation of the accounts of children during a wave of allegations of satanic ritual abuse, as well as the processes within the social work profession that supported the allegations despite a lack of evidence.

== Reception ==
=== Academic reviews ===
The book was reviewed by Joel Best, T. M. Luhrmann, James Beckford, and I. K. Wier. Robin Woffitt of the University of Surrey praised the book for clearly describing the origins of the satanic ritual abuse moral panic in the United Kingdom.

=== Subsequent academic reception ===
The English archaeologist Timothy Taylor critically discussed Fontaine's work in his book The Buried Soul: How Humans Invented Death (2002). He compared the work to the anthropologist William Arens's 1979 book The Man-Eating Myth, which he described as a "hollow certainty of viscerally insulated inexperience". Asserting that Arens uses a flawed methodology that has echoes of Speak of the Devil, Taylor himself suggests that multiple claims of the Satanic ritual abuse have been incorrectly dismissed for being considered "improbable".

== See also ==
- Organised Sexual Abuse (2013)

== Publication details ==
- La Fontaine, J. S. (1998). Speak of the Devil: allegations of satanic abuse in Britain. Cambridge, UK: Cambridge University Press. ISBN 0-521-62934-9.
