= Vienna Environmental Research Accelerator =

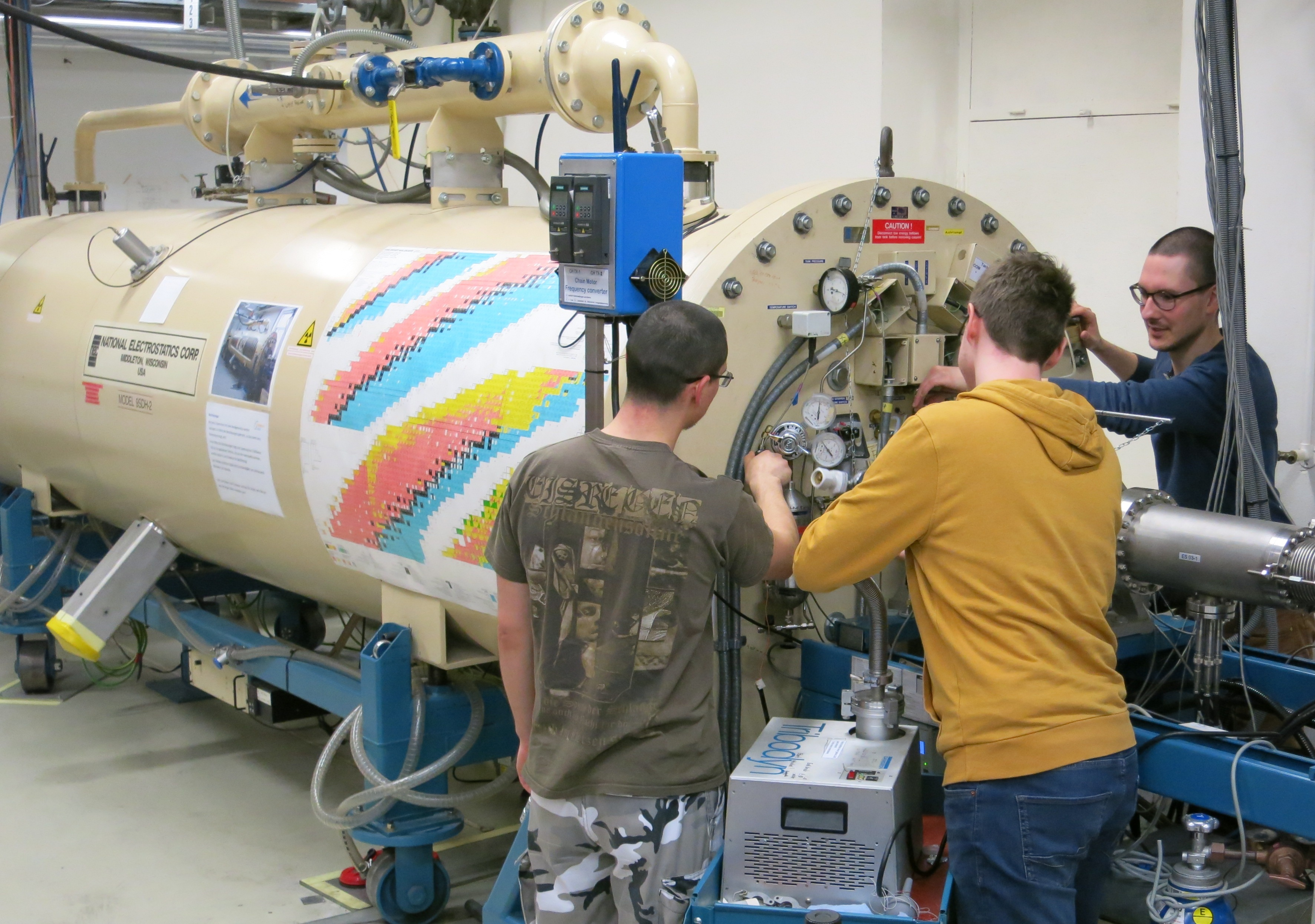
Accelerator tank VERA with students (2019)

The Vienna Environmental Research Accelerator, VERA, is a particle accelerator. It is operated by the University of Vienna and is dedicated to Accelerator Mass Spectrometry (AMS). It started operation in 1995.

The system is a 3-MV Pelletron type tandem accelerator, designed to accelerate protons or heavy ions.

== See also ==
- Accelerator mass spectrometry
- List of accelerator mass spectrometry facilities
