= Arizona Accelerator Mass Spectrometry Laboratory =

Particle physics studying laboratory at University of Arizona

Coordinates: 33.2296°N 110.9538°W

Arizona Accelerator Mass Spectrometry Laboratory focuses on the study of cosmogenic isotopes, and in particular the study of radiocarbon, or Carbon-14. As a laboratory, part of its aim is to function as a research center, training center, and general community resource. Its stated mission is conducting original research in cosmogenic isotopes. The AMS laboratory was established in 1981 at the University of Arizona.

This laboratory is used primarily to provide radiocarbon measurements. Hence, coverage in research areas is multidisciplinary. Coverage of dating objects includes general interest and scientific interest. For example, dating of the Dead Sea Scrolls was accomplished using this method.

== Tandem accelerators ==
Two, tandem accelerators at this facility accelerate energies up to 3 million volts (3 MeV). The function of these accelerators is to measure scarce, (cosmogenic) isotopes such as aluminium-26, beryllium-10, iodine-129 and the aforementioned carbon-14. In other words, the accelerators are used for measuring rare isotopes that are produced within earth materials, such as rocks or soil, in Earth's atmosphere, and in extraterrestrial objects such as meteorites. These are cosmogenic isotopes, produced from interaction with cosmic rays.

== Scope ==
Established in 1981, this facility is a National Science Foundation research facility. It is operated by both the Physics Department and the Geosciences Department of the University of Arizona. It is tasked with both scientific inquiry and education. Topical coverage of investigations includes archaeology, art history, forensic science, radioactive tracer studies, radiometric dating, the carbon cycle, cosmic ray physics, meteorites, geology, paleoclimate, faunal extinctions, hydrologic balance, frequency rate of forest fires, terrestrial magnetic field, solar wind, ocean sciences and instrument development.
