= Evolutionary Anthropology (journal) =

Bimonthly review journal

- Discipline: Anthropology
- Language: English
- Edited by: John Lindo

Publication details
- History: 1992–present
- Publisher: Wiley-Liss
- Frequency: Bimonthly
- Impact factor: 3.7 (2022)

Standard abbreviations
- ISO 4: Evol. Anthropol.

Indexing
- CODEN: EVANEW
- ISSN: 1060-1538 (print); 1520-6505 (web)
- LCCN: 93648679
- OCLC no.: 24883421

Links
- Journal homepage; Online access; Online archive

Evolutionary Anthropology is a review journal of anthropology. The journal also includes reviews of relevant new books, letters to the editor, and educational material for classroom teaching on evolutionary anthropology. The editor-in-chief is Jason Kamilar (University of Massachusetts). According to the Journal Citation Reports, the journal has a 2020 impact factor of 6.086, ranking it 2nd out of 93 journals in the category "Anthropology".
