= Speak of the devil =

English idiom

"Speak of the devil" is the short form of the English-language idiom "Speak of the devil and he doth appear" (or its alternative form "speak of the devil and he shall appear"). The form "talk of the devil" is also in use in the United Kingdom. It is used when an object of discussion unexpectedly becomes present during the conversation. It can also be used about a topic that quickly becomes relevant, such as the onset of rain or a car breaking down.

A similar construction appears in the 15th century Chinese novel Romance of the Three Kingdoms as 说曹操，曹操到 or "Speak of Cao Cao, Cao Cao arrives".

In many cultures, a different dangerous person or creature is referenced in the phrase.

- Serbian: "Speak of the wolf and he is at your door."
- French: "Speak of the wolf and you see its tail."
- Italian: "Speak of the devil and the horns appear."
- Finnish: "Pirusta kun puhuu, niin sarvet näkyy."
- Czech: "We talk about the wolf, and the wolf is at the door."
- Tunisian: "Mention the cat, and it comes to you jumping."
- Tunisian: "How long is your life!" (when it's a person being talked about and they show up)
- Norwegian: "Speak of the sun, it will shine."
- Swedish: "When you speak of the trolls, they're in the hallway."
- Hungarian: "Emlegetett szamár," meaning approximately "Here is the mentioned donkey."
- Spanish: "Talking about the King of Rome and through the door he comes."
- Korean: "A tiger will come if it is talked about."
