= Asparn an der Zaya =

- Municipality
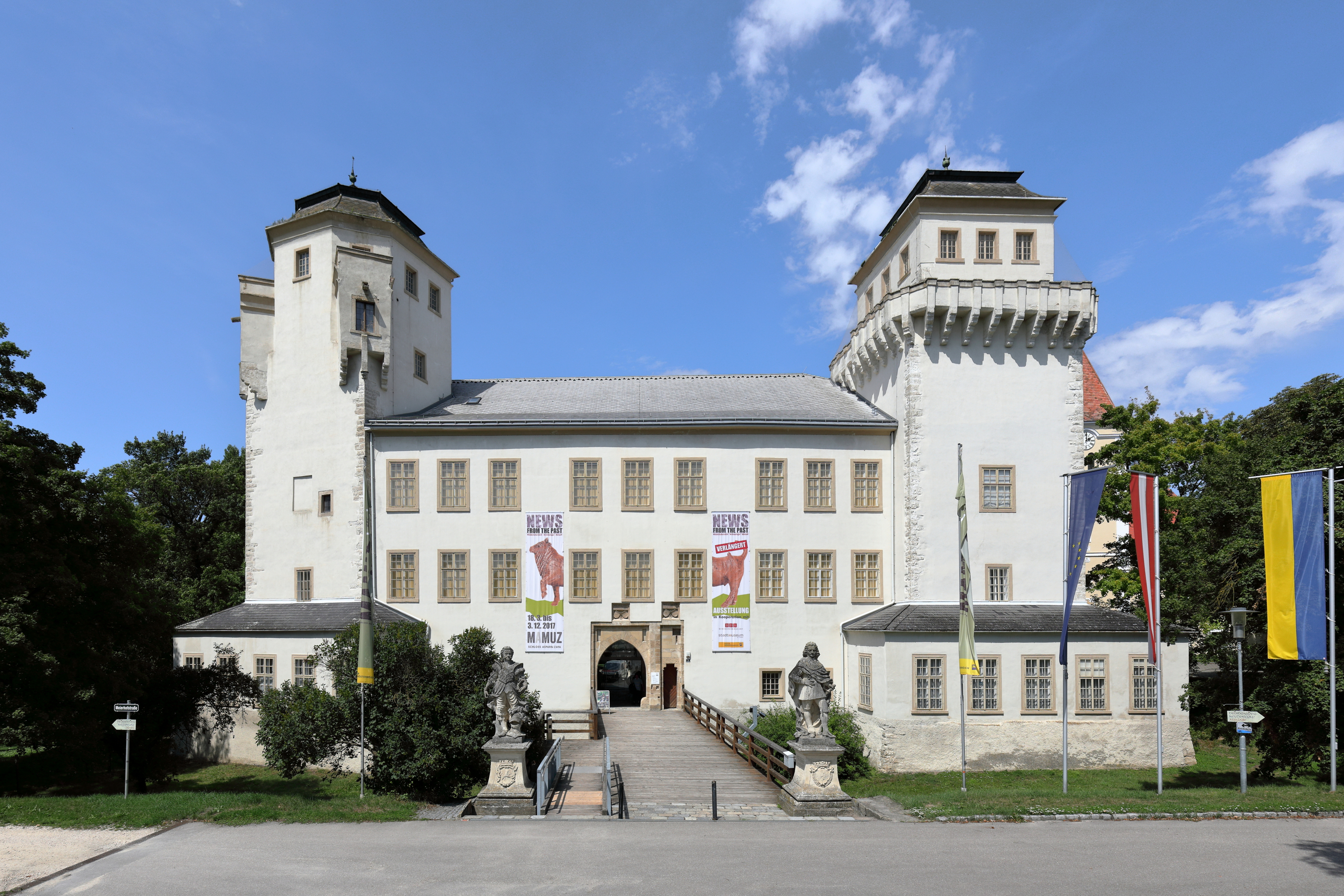
- Asparn Palace

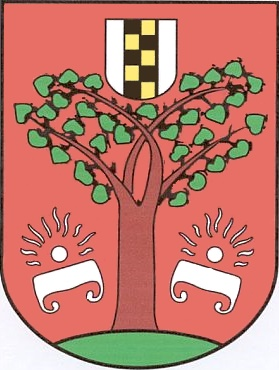
- Coat of arms

- Location within Austria
- Coordinates: 48°35′N 16°30′E
- Country: Austria
- State: Lower Austria
- District: Mistelbach

Government
  - Mayor: Manfred Meixner (ÖVP)

Area
  - Total: 40.49 km^{2} (15.63 sq mi)
- Elevation: 222 m (728 ft)

Population (2018-01-01)
  - Total: 1,865
  - Density: 46.06/km^{2} (119.3/sq mi)
- Time zone: UTC+1 (CET)
  - Summer (DST): UTC+2 (CEST)
- Postal code: 2151
- Area code: 02577
- Website: www.asparn.at

Asparn an der Zaya is a town in the district of Mistelbach in the Austrian state of Lower Austria.

== Population ==
Historical population
Year	Pop.	±%
1971	1,862	—
1981	1,710	−8.2%
1991	1,688	−1.3%
2001	1,814	+7.5%
2011	1,768	−2.5%
2021	1,877	+6.2%
