= Accelerator mass spectrometry =

Accelerator that accelerates ions to high speeds before analysis

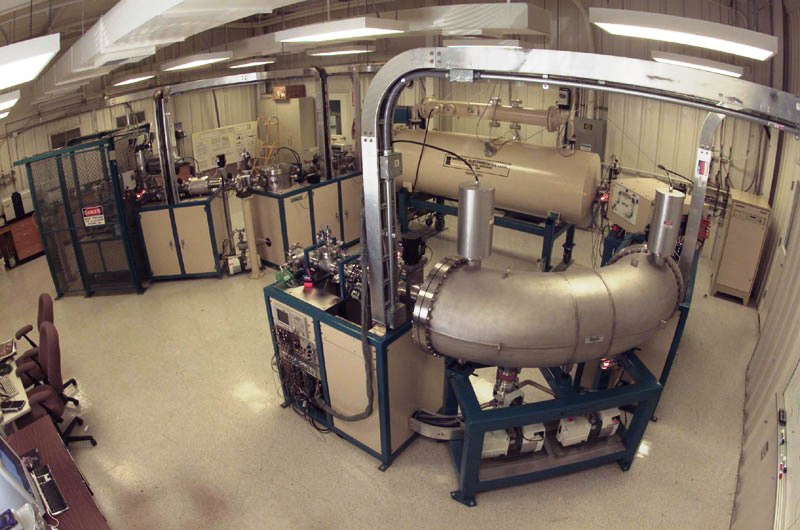
- Accelerator mass spectrometer at Lawrence Livermore National Laboratory
- Acronym: AMS
- Classification: Mass spectrometry
- Analytes: Organic molecules Biomolecules

Other techniques
- Related: Particle accelerator

Accelerator mass spectrometry (AMS) is a form of mass spectrometry that accelerates ions to extraordinarily high kinetic energies before mass analysis. The special strength of AMS among the different methods of mass spectrometry is its ability to separate a rare isotope from an abundant neighboring mass ("abundance sensitivity", e.g. ^{14}C from ^{12}C). The method suppresses molecular isobars completely and in many cases can also separate atomic isobars (e.g. ^{14}N from ^{14}C). This makes possible the detection of naturally occurring, long-lived radio-isotopes such as ^{10}Be, ^{36}Cl, ^{26}Al and ^{14}C. (Their typical isotopic abundance ranges from 10^{−12} to 10^{−18}.)

AMS can outperform the competing technique of decay counting for all isotopes where the half-life is long enough. Other advantages of AMS include its short measuring time as well as its ability to detect atoms in extremely small samples.

== Method ==
Generally, negative ions are created (atoms are ionized) in an ion source. In fortunate cases, this already allows the suppression of an unwanted isobar, which does not form negative ions (as ^{14}N in the case of ^{14}C measurements). The pre-accelerated ions are usually separated by a first mass spectrometer of sector-field type and enter an electrostatic "tandem accelerator". This is a large nuclear particle accelerator based on the principle of a tandem van de Graaff accelerator operating at 0.2 to many million volts with two stages operating in tandem to accelerate the particles. At the connecting point between the two stages, the ions change charge from negative to positive by passing through a thin layer of matter ("stripping", either gas or a thin carbon foil). Molecules will break apart in this stripping stage. The complete suppression of molecular isobars (e.g. ^{13}CH^{−} in the case of ^{14}C measurements) is one reason for the exceptional abundance sensitivity of AMS. Additionally, the impact strips off several of the ion's electrons, converting it into a positively charged ion. In the second half of the accelerator, the now positively charged ion is accelerated away from the highly positive centre of the electrostatic accelerator which previously attracted the negative ion. When the ions leave the accelerator they are positively charged and are moving at several percent of the speed of light. In the second stage of mass spectrometer, the fragments from the molecules are separated from the ions of interest. This spectrometer may consist of magnetic or electric sectors, and so-called velocity selectors, which utilizes both electric fields and magnetic fields. After this stage, no background is left, unless a stable (atomic) isobar forming negative ions exists (e.g. ^{36}S if measuring ^{36}Cl), which is not suppressed at all by the setup described so far. Thanks to the high energy of the ions, these can be separated by methods borrowed from nuclear physics, like degrader foils and gas-filled magnets. Individual ions are finally detected by single-ion counting (with silicon surface-barrier detectors, ionization chambers, and/or time-of-flight telescopes). Thanks to the high energy of the ions, these detectors can provide additional identification of background isobars by nuclear-charge determination.

=== Generalizations ===
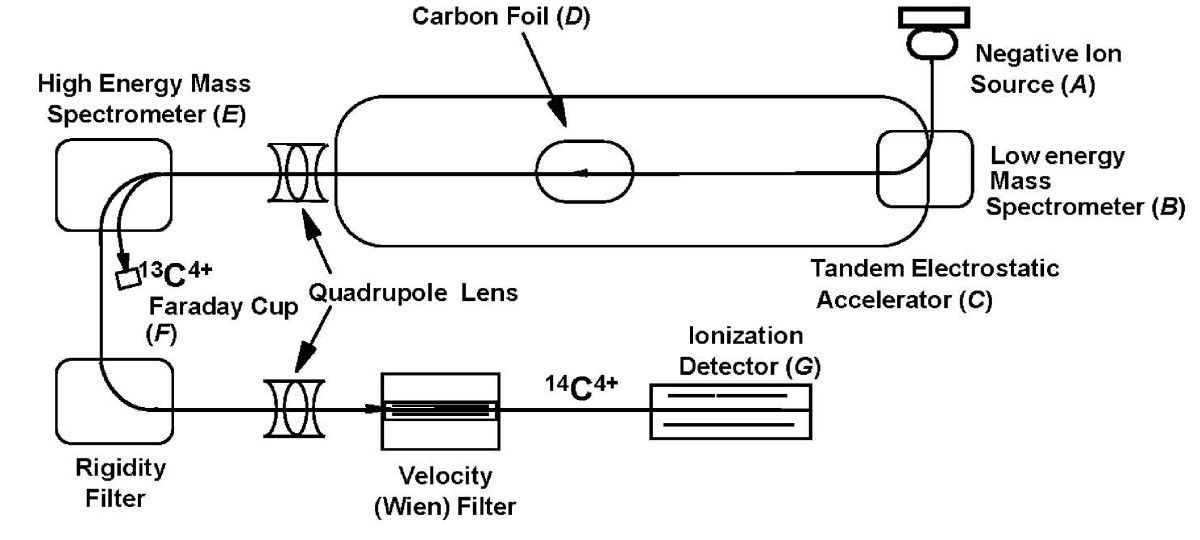
Schematic of an accelerator mass spectrometer

The above is just one example. There are other ways in which AMS is achieved; however, they all work based on improving mass selectivity and specificity by creating high kinetic energies before molecule destruction by stripping, followed by single-ion counting.

== History ==
L.W. Alvarez and Robert Cornog of the United States first used an accelerator as a mass spectrometer in 1939 when they employed a cyclotron to demonstrate that ^{3}He was stable; from this observation, they immediately and correctly concluded that the other mass-3 isotope, tritium (^{3}H), was radioactive. In 1977, inspired by this early work, Richard A. Muller at the Lawrence Berkeley Laboratory recognised that modern accelerators could accelerate radioactive particles to an energy where the background interferences could be separated using particle identification techniques. He published the seminal paper in Science showing how accelerators (cyclotrons and linear) could be used for detection of tritium, radiocarbon (^{14}C), and several other isotopes of scientific interest including ^{10}Be; he also reported the first successful radioisotope date experimentally obtained using tritium. His paper was the direct inspiration for other groups using cyclotrons (G. Raisbeck and F. Yiou, in France) and tandem linear accelerators (D. Nelson, R. Korteling, W. Stott at McMaster). K. Purser and colleagues also published the successful detection of radiocarbon using their tandem at Rochester. Soon afterwards the Berkeley and French teams reported the successful detection of ^{10}Be, an isotope widely used in geology. Soon the accelerator technique, since it was more sensitive by a factor of about 1,000, virtually supplanted the older "decay counting" methods for these and other radioisotopes. In 1982, AMS labs began processing archaeological samples for radiocarbon dating

== Applications ==
There are many applications for AMS throughout a variety of disciplines. AMS is most often employed to determine the concentration of ^{14}C, e.g. by archaeologists for radiocarbon dating. Compared to other radiocarbon dating methods, AMS requires smaller sample sizes (about 50 mg), while yielding extensive chronologies. MS technology has expanded the scope of radiocarbon dating. Samples ranging from 50,000 years old to 100 years old can be successfully dated using AMS, as other forms of mass spectrometry provide insufficient suppression of molecular isobars to resolve ^{13}CH and ^{12}CH_{2} from ^{14}C atoms. Because of the long half-life of ^{14}C, decay counting requires significantly larger samples. ^{10}Be, ^{26}Al, and ^{36}Cl are used for surface exposure dating in geology. ^{3}H, ^{14}C, ^{36}Cl, and ^{129}I are used as hydrological tracers.

Accelerator mass spectrometry is widely used in biomedical research. In particular, ^{41}Ca has been used to measure bone resorption in postmenopausal women.

== See also ==
- List of accelerator mass spectrometry facilities
- Arizona Accelerator Mass Spectrometry Laboratory

== Bibliography ==
- Gowlett, J. A. J.; Hedges, R. E. M., eds. (1986). Archaeological Results From Accelerator Dating. Oxford University Committee for Archaeology. ISBN 978-0-947816-11-7.
- Gove, H. E. (1999). From Hiroshima to the Iceman. Institute of Physics. ISBN 978-0-7503-0557-0.
- Tuniz, C. (1998). Accelerator Mass Spectrometry. CRC Press. ISBN 978-0-8493-4538-8.
- Harris, D.R (August 25, 1987). "The impact on archaeology of radiocarbon dating by accelerator mass spectrometry". Philosophical Transactions of the Royal Society of London. Series A, Mathematical and Physical Sciences. 323 (1569): 23–43. Bibcode:1987RSPTA.323...23H. doi:10.1098/rsta.1987.0070. S2CID 91488734.
- Morlan, Richard. "Radiocarbon Dating Principles". Canadian Archaeology. Canadian Archaeological Radiocarbon Database.
