= Assur =

Former Assyrian capital, now archaeological site in Iraq

- Aššur ܐܫܘܪ آشور
- Ashur
- Location within Iraq Location within Near East
- 35°27′24″N 43°15′45″E
- Type: Settlement
- Periods: Early Bronze Age to classical antiquity
- Location: Saladin Governorate, Iraq
- Region: Mesopotamia

History
- Built: Early Dynastic Period
- Abandoned: 3rd century AD, fully abandoned 14th century AD

Site notes
- Excavation dates: 1900–1914, 1988–1990, 2000–2001, 2023–present
- Archaeologists: Friedrich Delitzsch, Robert Koldewey, Walter Andrae, B. Hrouda, R. Dittmann, Peter A. Miglus

UNESCO World Heritage Site
- Official name: Ashur (Qal'at Sherqat)
- Type: Cultural
- Criteria: iii, iv
- Designated: 2003 (27th session)
- Reference no.: 1130
- Region: Arab States
- Endangered: 2003–present

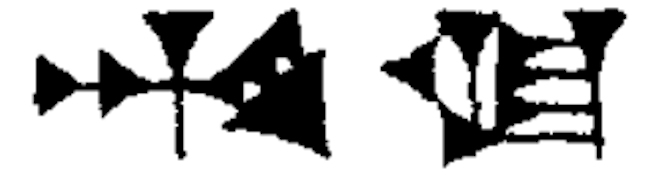
Aššur, (Note: /ˈæʃʊər/; Sumerian: 𒀭𒊹𒆠 AN.ŠAR_{2}^{KI}, Assyrian cuneiform: Aš-šur^{KI}, "City of God Aššur"; Also phonetically 𒀀𒇳𒊬 a-šur_{4} or 𒀸𒋩 aš-šur Syriac: ܐܫܘܪ Āšūr; Old Persian: 𐎠𐎰𐎢𐎼 Aθur, Persian: آشور Āšūr; Hebrew: אַשּׁוּר ʾAššūr, Arabic: اشور) also known as Ashur and Qal'at Sherqat, was the capital of the Middle Assyrian Empire for a time, of the Neo-Assyrian Empire (911–609 BC) and a semi-independent state during the Parthian Empire between the 2nd century BC and mid 3rd century AD. The remains of the city lie on the western bank of the Tigris River, north of the confluence with its tributary, the Little Zab, in what is now Iraq, more precisely in the al-Shirqat District of the Saladin Governorate. Assur lies 65 kilometres (40 mi) south of the site of Kalhu (the biblical Calah, Nimrud) and 100 km (60 mi) south of Nineveh.

Occupation of the city itself continued for approximately 3,000 years, from the Early Dynastic Period to the mid-3rd century AD, when the city was sacked by the Sasanian Empire, after which it was sparsely populated until the massacres of Assyrian Christians conducted by Tamurlane in the 14th century AD after which the remaining population relocated to the countryside. The site is a World Heritage Site and was added to that organization's list of sites in danger in 2003 as a result of a proposed dam, which would flood some of the site.

The city lies on a south facing mountain spur with a triangular layout. The northern, higher, area held public buildings including the palace and temples of Ashur, Anu, Adad, Sin, Shamash, and Ishtar.

== Archaeology ==
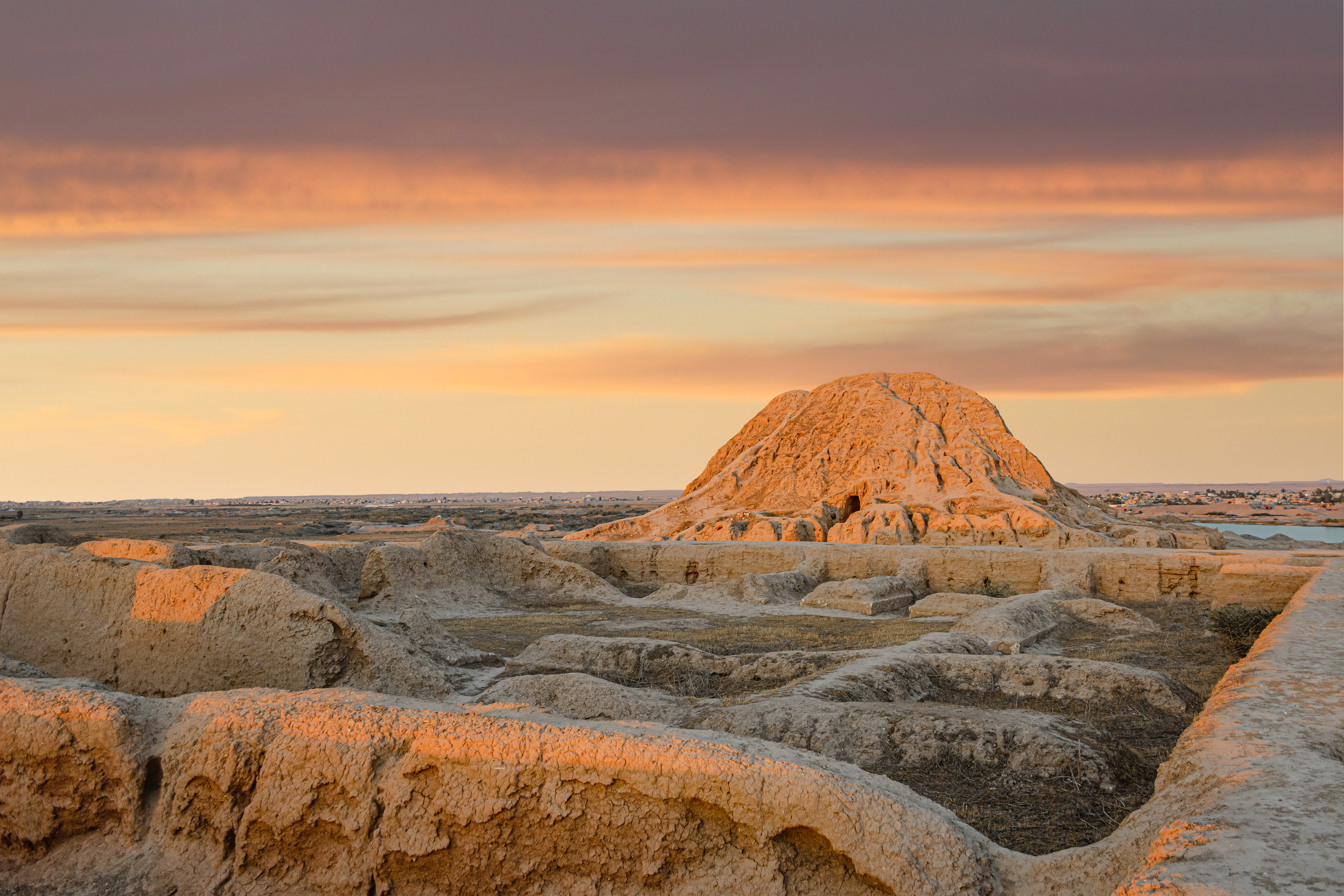
Ziqqurat Ashur and Ashur city walls

Assur was briefly excavated by Austen Henry Layard and Hormuzd Rassam, in the 1800s while working at Nineveh. Rassam worked there in the 1850s and 1870s, though rarely present in person. Regular exploration of Assur began in 1898 by German archaeologists. Excavations began in 1900 by Friedrich Delitzsch, and were continued in 1903–1914 by a team from the Deutsche Orient-Gesellschaft led initially by Robert Koldewey and later by Walter Andrae. Working 12 months a year, mainly in the northern public area, they excavated the Anu, Adad, Sin, Shamash, Ishtar, Nabu, and Assur temples along with the Assur/Enlil ziggurat and the Old Palace. Additionally, the city's double city was also cleared. More than 16,000 clay tablets with cuneiform texts were discovered and are held at the Pergamon Museum in Berlin. Several thousand shell, stone, glass and ceramic beads were encountered at a deep level with two of the beads being much later determined to be Baltic amber. About 700 worked and unworked bone and ivory objects also found. These excavations were thinly published at the time due to the outbreak of World War I in 1914, and later efforts have been made to correct that.

Because of the large construction overburden from later periods a full stratigraphy was only possible at the site of the Ishtar temple in the Nabu district. Eight primary construction/occupation levels were determined for the Ishtar temple (A–H). The most recent layers (A–C), called "later temples", began with the oldest built by Tukulti-Ninurta I (1243–1207). The oldest levels (D–H) began with the earliest in the Early Dynastic period. The excavator believed that there was an occupational hiatus in level F during which no temple existed.

Iraqi archaeologists worked at Assur intermittently after 1979, primarily doing restoration work and room clearing but some excavation activity continued. Parthian graves were excavated and an octagonal prism of Tiglath-pileser, and 52 Neo-Assyrian period tablets were found.

More recently, Assur was excavated by Barthel Hrouda for LMU Munich and the Bavarian Ministry of Culture in 1990. The team worked in the west-central part of the site about 120 meters south of the Nabu Temple. During the same period, in 1988 and 1989, the site was being worked by R. Dittmann on behalf of the Deutsche Forschungsgemeinschaft. In 2000–2001 the site was excavated by Peter A. Miglus.

Excavation at the site resumed in 2023 by the Assur Excavation Project led by Professor Karen Radner and a team of Iraqi and European colleagues. Work continued in 2024. In 2023, after a drone survey, a caesium total field magnetometer survey of the mostly Parthian New Town area of Assur on the east side of the city. Data from a small, 2 hectare, magnetometry survey done in the central area of Assur was merged in. A trial electrical resistivity tomography test was conducted and also eight core samples were taken.

In 2024 Iraqi and European archaeologists took four core samples in the deepest layers below the foundation of the Ishtar temple showing that it was built on a thick layer of pure sand, standard practice in Southern Mesopotamia but rare in later temples built at Assur. They retrieved one charcoal sample at the earliest point which was found to have a radiocarbon date of 2896–2702 BC (calibration method used IntCal20). The early excavators had dated the founding of the Ishtar temple to early in the 3rd millennium BC but later work had revised that to the Early Dynastic III period (2600–2350 BC). Work continued in 2025 and finds included 8 fragments with cuneiform text.

== History ==
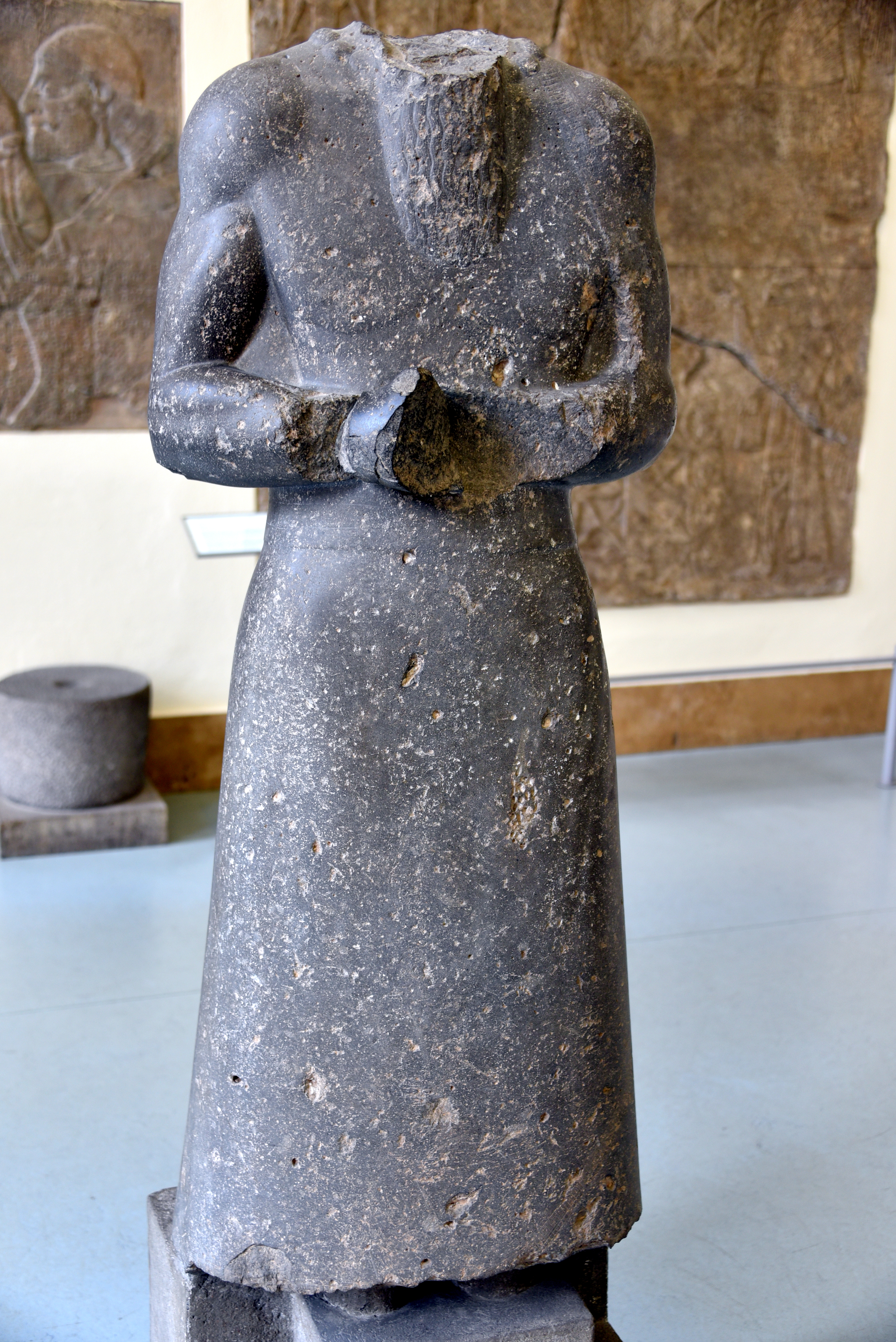
Akkadian period statue body found at Assur

=== Early Bronze Age ===
==== Early Dynastic I-III ====
While there are no textual references to Assur in the Early Dynastic period a number of Early Dynastic III finds were made in the early excavations at the Ishtar temple, including a number of seated and standing female statues. More recent work at the Ishtar Temple, including a radiocarbon date, suggests a foundation for the city by the Early Dynastic I period.

==== Ur III period ====
During the Third Dynasty of Ur (c. 2112–2004 BC), Assur was under the control of Ur. One of the governors of Assur, Zariqum, is known. From references in texts found at Drehem and Umma it is known that he was originally an Ur III official from Shulgi year 44 until year 47 (about 3.5 years) then from Shulgi year 48 until Amar-Sin year 5 (about 6 years) was governor of Assur. He then became governor of Susa from Amar-Sin year 5 until Shu-Sin year 4 (about 8 years). It is thought that at that time, Assur and Susa were under the control of a single governor. An inscription was found in the Ishtar temple where Zariqum recorded building a temple for Bēlat-ekallim (Ninegal), for the life of Amar-Sin.

=== Middle Bronze ===
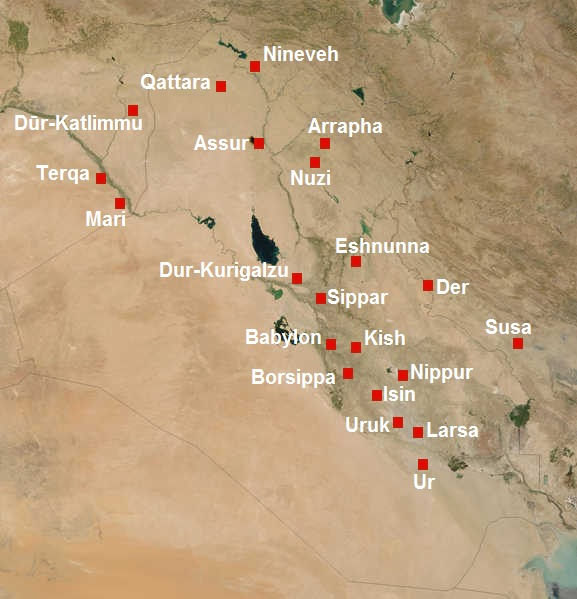
Mesopotamia in the 2nd millennium BC

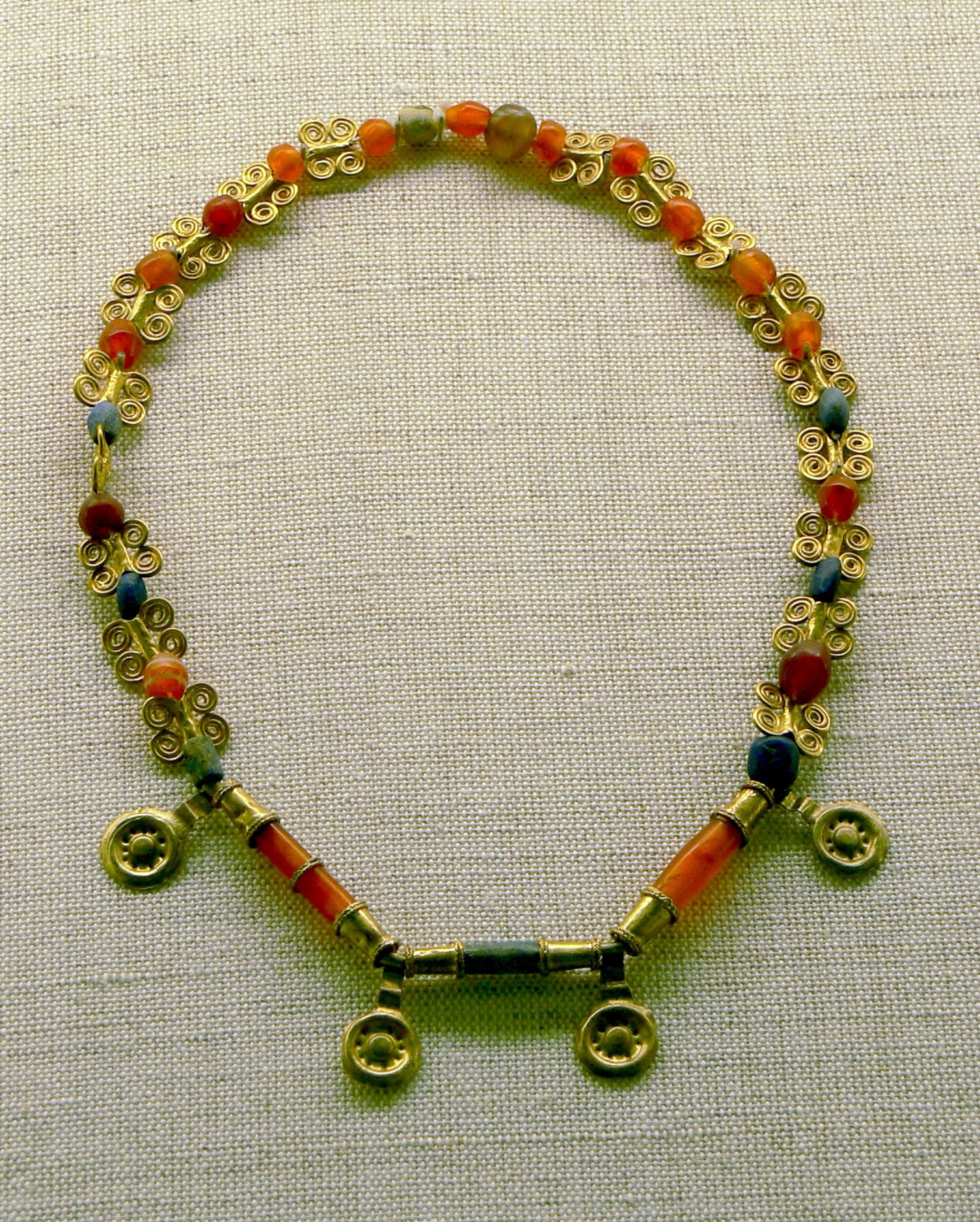
Golden necklace (2000 BC). Grave 20 of Assur

==== Isin-Larsa period ====
Around the end of the 21st century BC, the Ur III Empire collapsed at the hands of the Elamites, and the control of Assur shifted briefly to Eshnunna. A weight in the shape of a duck found at Assur read "Dāduša, son of Ipiq-Adad, king of Eshnunna, to Inibšina, his daughter, he presented [this weight]."

==== Old Assyrian period ====
In this period Assur was a central hub the "karum" trading network which stretched through Mesopotamia, Syria, and Anatolia. Kültepe was another important location in this system. The city was ruled at this time by a city assembly which wielded legislative and judicial power. A limum was a city official appointed yearly to head city finances. Transactions were dated by their names in Limmu (eponyms). An example is "month: 'Bēlat-ekallim'; eponym: 'Qīš-Amurrim, son of Apapa'". Excavations found several hundred Old Assyrian period inscriptions on tablets and bricks, many fragmentary. A few cylinder seals from this period were found at Assur (one of a ruler, Irishum I), though only from their clay sealings. Local rulers rarely and lightly affected Assur, mostly on matters of wide trading interest. An example would be Ilusumma where a text of his (BM 115690 found in the Istar temple at Assur) reads:

"The andurārum (debt relief) of the Akkadians and their children I established. I purified their copper. I established their andurārum from the border of the marshes(?) and Ur and Nippur, Awal, and Kismar, Der of the god Ishtaran, as far as Assur."

==== Shamshi-Adad I Dynasty ====
Shamshi-Adad I's (1808–1775 BC), Amorite ruler of the Kingdom of Upper Mesopotamia, eventually conquered Assur and made it his religious capital (his primary capital being Ekallatum and later Shubat-Enlil). In this era, the Great Royal Palace was built, and the temple of Assur was expanded and enlarged with a ziggurat. However, this empire met its end when Hammurabi, the Amorite king of Babylon conquered and incorporated the city into the First Babylonian dynasty empire following the death of Ishme-Dagan I around 1756 BC, while the next three Assyrian kings were viewed as vassals of Babylon.

=== Late Bronze ===
One local ruler early in this period, Puzur-Ashur III, is known from inscriptions. Temples to the moon god Sin (Nanna) and the sun god Shamash were built and dedicated through the 15th century BC. The city was subsequently subjugated by the king of Mitanni, Shaushtatar in the late 15th century, taking the gold and silver doors of the temple to his capital, Waššukanni, as spoils.

After the Mitanni Empire was destroyed by the Hittites Ashur-uballit I annexed the eastern portions of that empire forming the Middle Assyrian Empire (1353–1056 BC). The following centuries witnessed the restoration of the old temples and palaces of Assur, and the city once more became the throne of an empire from 1365 BC to 1050 BC. Tukulti-Ninurta I (1244–1208 BC) also constructed a new temple to the goddess Ishtar in the location of the original temple. The Anu-Adad temple was established later during the reign of Tiglath-Pileser I (1115–1075 BC). The walled area of the city in the Middle Assyrian period made up some 1.2 square kilometres (300 acres).

=== Iron Age ===
==== Neo-Assyrian Empire ====
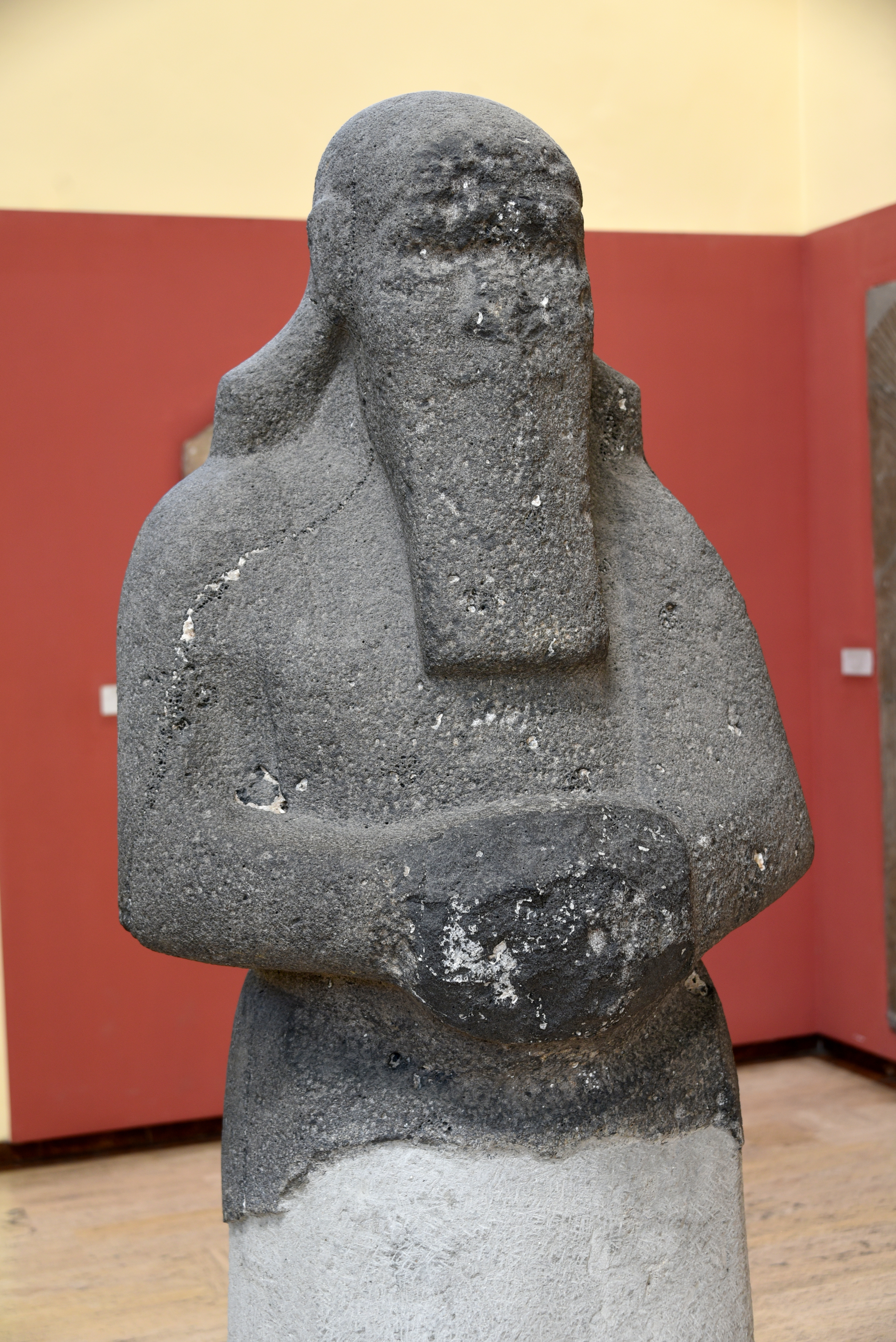
An unfinished basalt statue of Shalmaneser III. From Assur, Iraq. 858–824 BCE

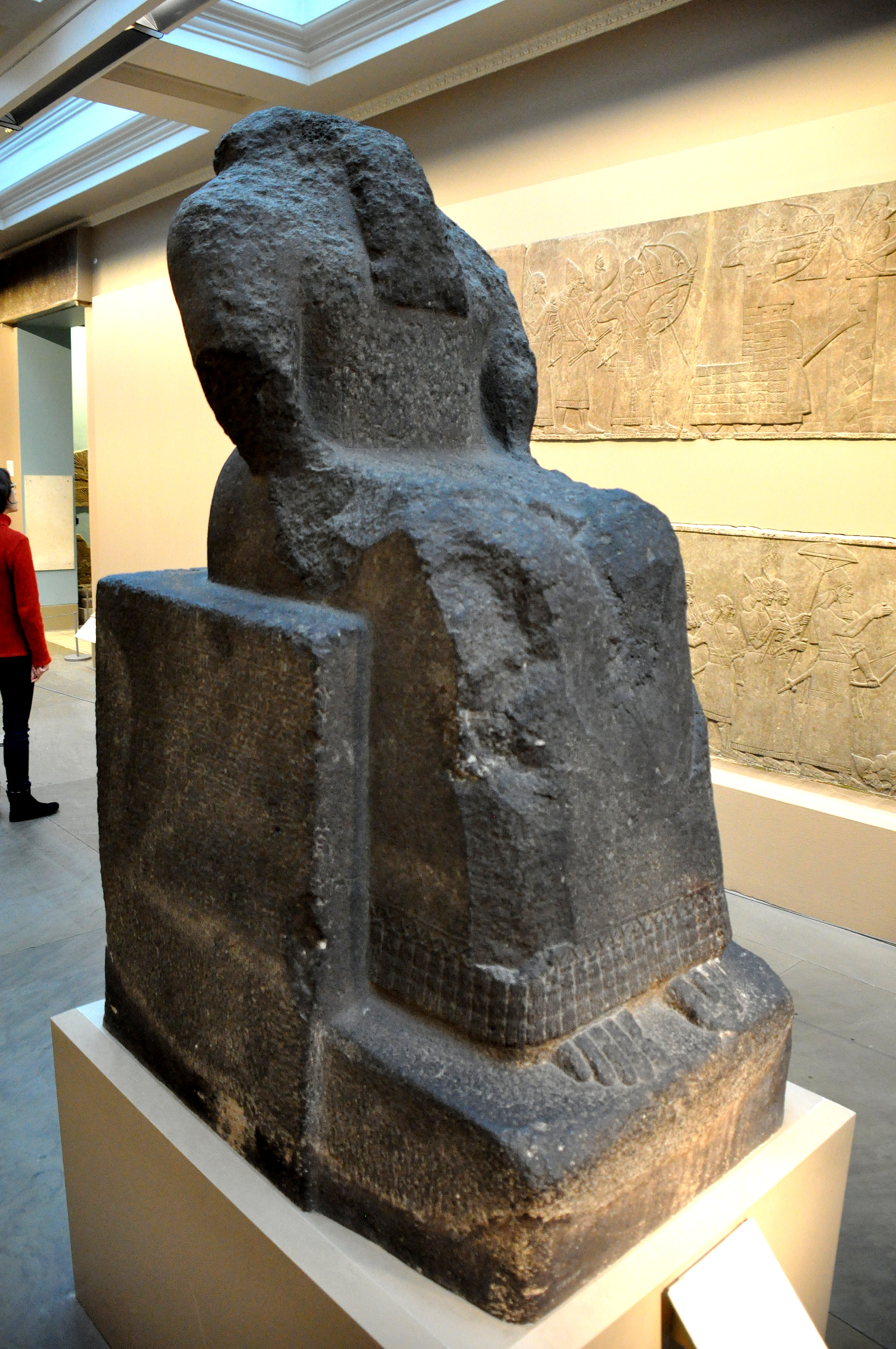
A statue of the god Kidudu, guardian spirit of the wall of the city of Ashur. Circa 835 BC.

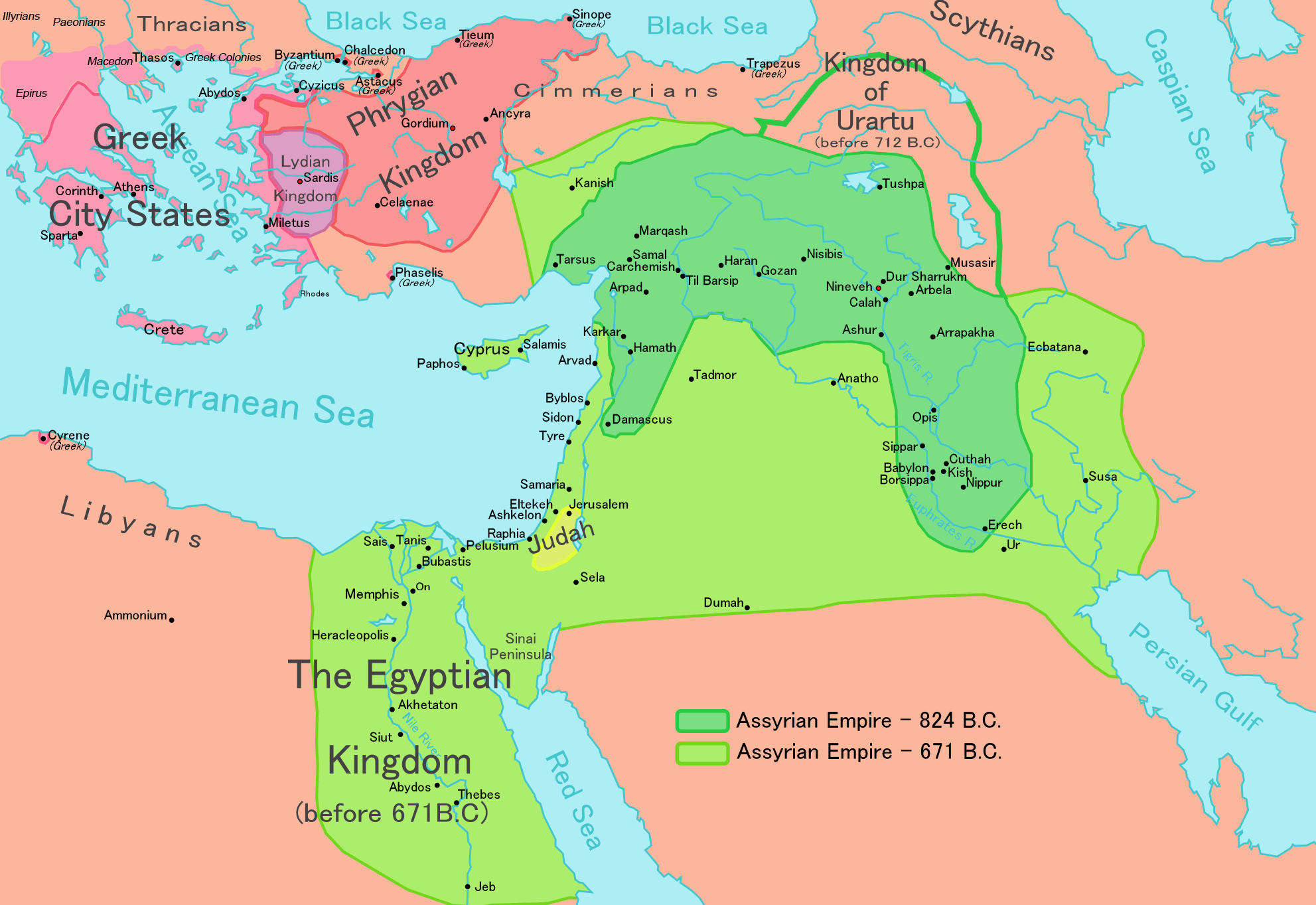
A map of Assyria

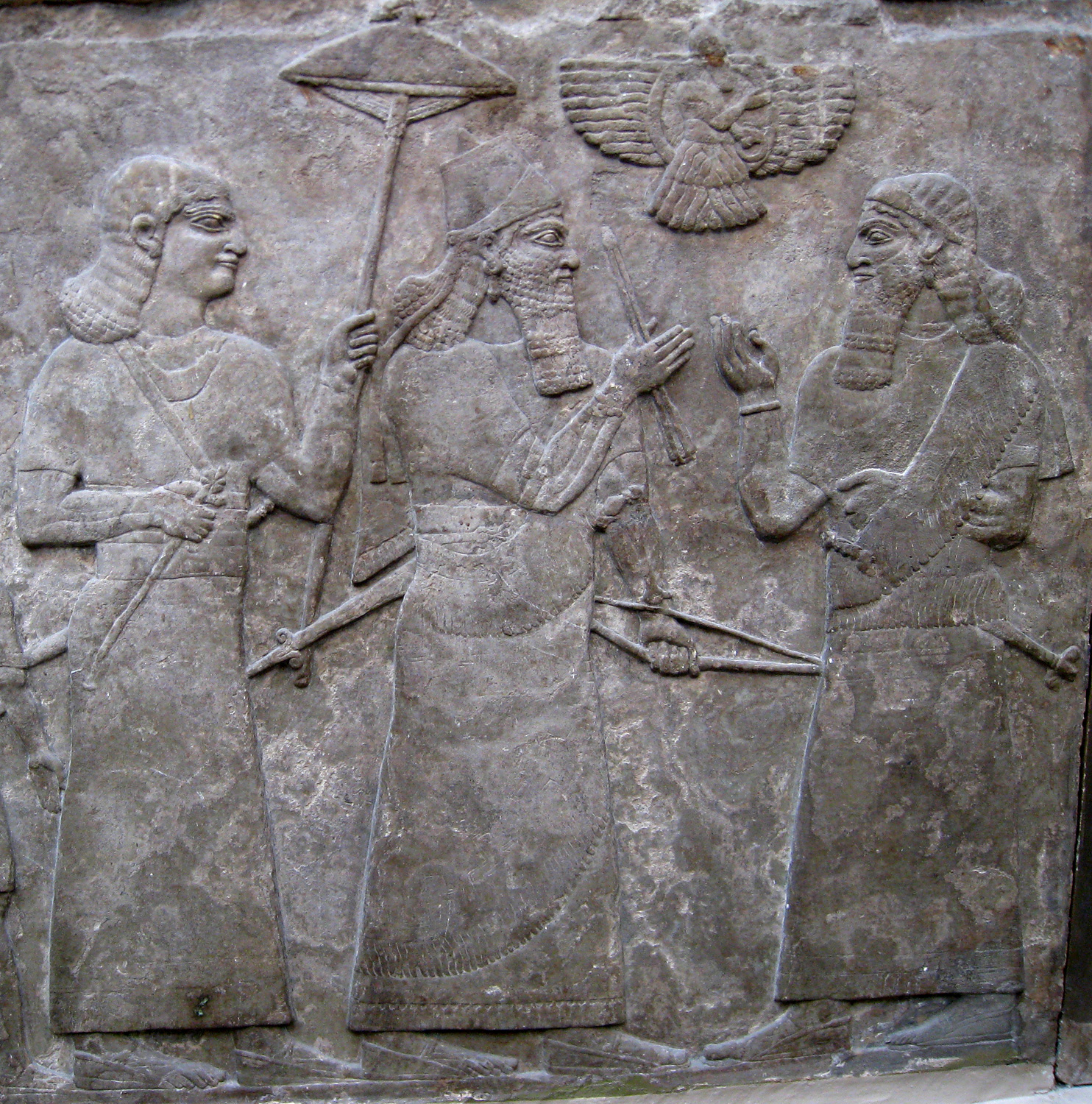
A relief of Ashurnasirpal II, with an official

In the Neo-Assyrian Empire (912–605 BC) the royal residence was transferred to other Assyrian cities. Ashurnasirpal II (884–859 BC) moved the capital from Assur to Kalhu (Calah/Nimrud). With the reign of Sargon II (722–705 BC), a new capital began to rise: Dur-Sharrukin (Fortress of Sargon). He died in battle and his son and successor Sennacherib (705–682 BC) abandoned the city, choosing to magnify Nineveh as his royal capital. The city of Assur remained the religious center of the empire due to its temple of the national god Ashur.

In the reign of Sennacherib (705–682 BC), the House of the New Year, Akitu, was built, and the festivities celebrated in the city. Many of the kings were also buried beneath the Old Palace while some queens were buried in the other capitals such as the wife of Sargon, Ataliya. The city was sacked and largely destroyed during the decisive battle of Assur, a major confrontation between the Assyrian and Median and Babylonian armies.

=== Achaemenid Empire ===
After the Babylonians and Medes were overthrown by the Persians as the dominant force in ancient Mesopotamia and Iran, Assyria was ruled by the Persian Achaemenid Empire (as Athura) from 549 BC to 330 BC (see Achaemenid Assyria). The Athura had been responsible for gold and glazing works of the palace and for providing Lebanese cedar timber, respectively. The city and region of Ashur had once more gained a degree of militaristic and economic strength. A revolt by the Assyrians took place in 520 BC but ultimately failed. Assyria seems to have recovered dramatically and flourished during this period. It became a major agricultural and administrative center of the Achaemenid Empire, and its soldiers were a mainstay of the Persian Army.

=== Parthian Empire ===
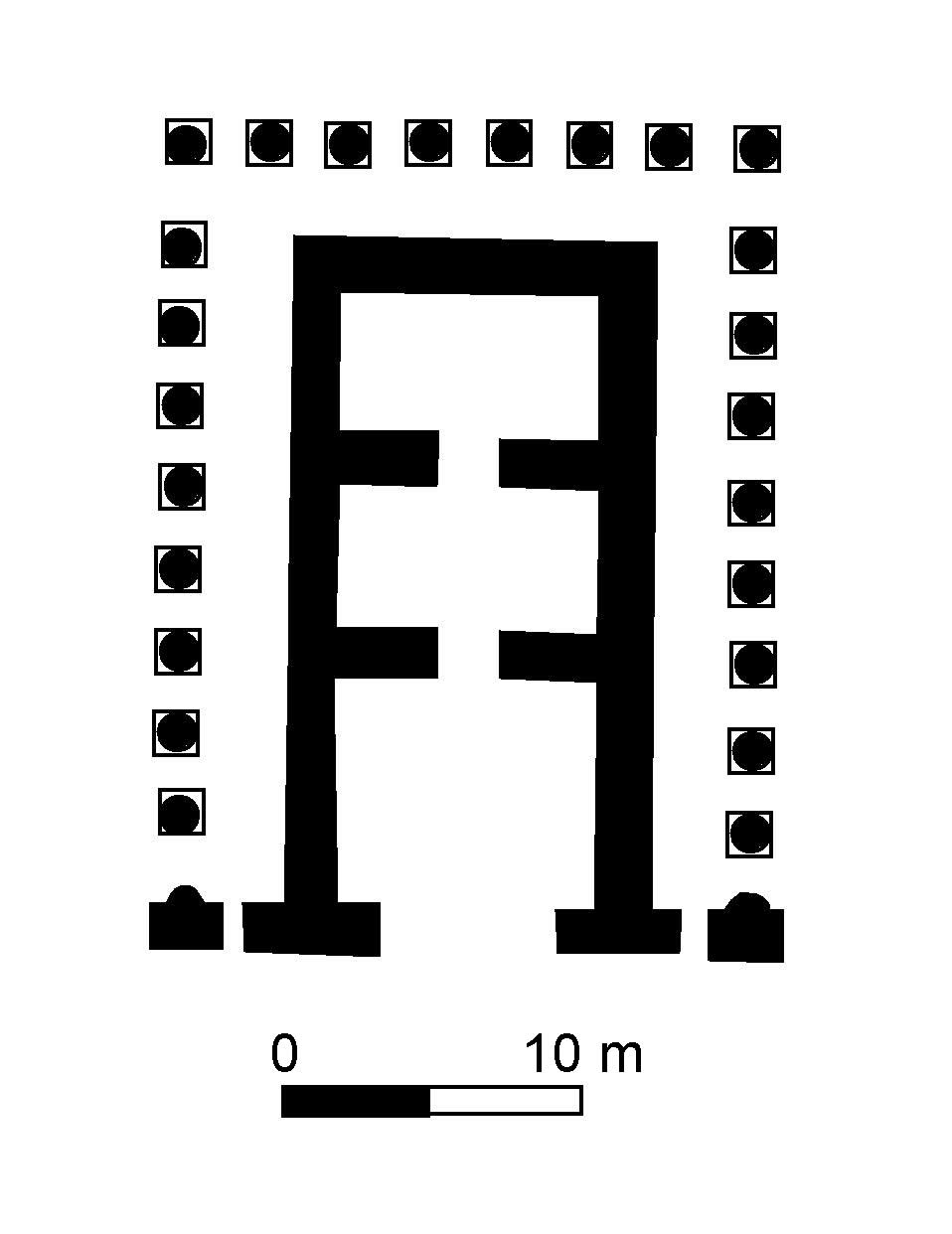
Parthian temple in Assur.

The city revived during the Parthian Empire period, particularly between 150 BC and 257 AD, its population expanding and it becoming an administrative centre of Parthian-ruled Assuristan. Assyriologists Simo Parpola and Patricia Crone suggest Assur may have had outright independence in this period alongside other Assyrian polities such as Adiabene, Osroene, Beth Nuhadra and Beth Garmai. New administrative buildings were erected to the north of the old city, and a palace to the south. The old temple dedicated to the god Ashur was rebuilt, as were temples to other Assyrian gods.

Eastern Aramaic inscriptions from the remains of Assur have yielded insight into the Parthian-era city with Assyria having its own Mesopotamian Aramaic Syriac script, which was the same in terms of grammar and syntax as that found at the Assyrian city of Edessa and elsewhere in the states of Osroene, Adiabene, Hatra and Nuhadra (modern Dohuk).

German semiticist Klaus Beyer (1929-2014) published over 600 inscriptions from Mesopotamian towns and cities including Assur, Dura-Europos, Hatra, Gaddala, Tikrit and Tur Abdin.

The Roman historian Festus wrote in about 370 that in AD 116 Trajan formed from his conquests east of the Euphrates the new Roman provinces of Mesopotamia and Assyria. The existence of the latter Roman province is questioned by C.S. Lightfoot and F. Miller. In any case, just two years after the province's supposed creation, Trajan's successor Hadrian restored Trajan's eastern conquests to the Parthians, preferring to live with him in peace and friendship.

There were later Roman incursions into Mesopotamia under Lucius Verus and under Septimius Severus, who set up the Roman provinces of Mesopotamia and the kingdoms of Osroene and Adiabene.

Assur was captured and sacked by Ardashir I of the Sasanian Empire c. 257 AD, whereafter the city was largely destroyed and much (though not all) of its population was dispersed, with a more sparse Assyrian population enduring until the massacres of Assyrian Christians by Tamurlane in the 14th century AD after which the remaining population spread into the countryside and the area saw an influx of Arabs and Kurds.

== Threats to Assur ==
The site was put on UNESCO's List of World Heritage in Danger in 2003, at which time the site was threatened by a looming large-scale dam project that would have submerged the ancient archaeological site. The dam project was put on hold shortly after the 2003 invasion of Iraq. The Makhoul Dam project has recently been revived.

The territory around the ancient site was occupied by the Islamic State (IS) in 2015. Since IS had destroyed a number of ancient historical sites, including the cities of Hatra, Khorsabad, and Nimrud, fears rose that Assur would be destroyed too. According to some sources, the citadel of Assur was destroyed or badly damaged in May 2015 by members of IS using improvised explosive devices. An AP report from December 2016 after the Iraqi forces had retaken the area, said that the militants tried to destroy the city's grand entrance arches, but they remained standing and a local historian described the damage as "minor".

== See also ==
- Chronology of the ancient Near East
- Cities of the ancient Near East
- List of Mesopotamian deities
- List of Mesopotamian dynasties
- Mesopotamian religion
- Short chronology timeline
