= Canuel =

Canuel is a surname. Notable people with the name include:

- Denis Canuel (born 1962), Canadian archer
- Elizabeth Canuel, American chemical oceanographer
- Érik Canuel (1961–2024), Canadian film and television director
- Karol-Ann Canuel (born 1988), Canadian racing cyclist
- René Canuel (born 1936), member of the House of Commons of Canada
- Simon Canuel (1767–1840), French general of the Revolutionary and Napoleonic Wars
- Yvan Canuel (1935–1999), Canadian actor
