= Radiocarbon dating =

Method for determining the age of objects

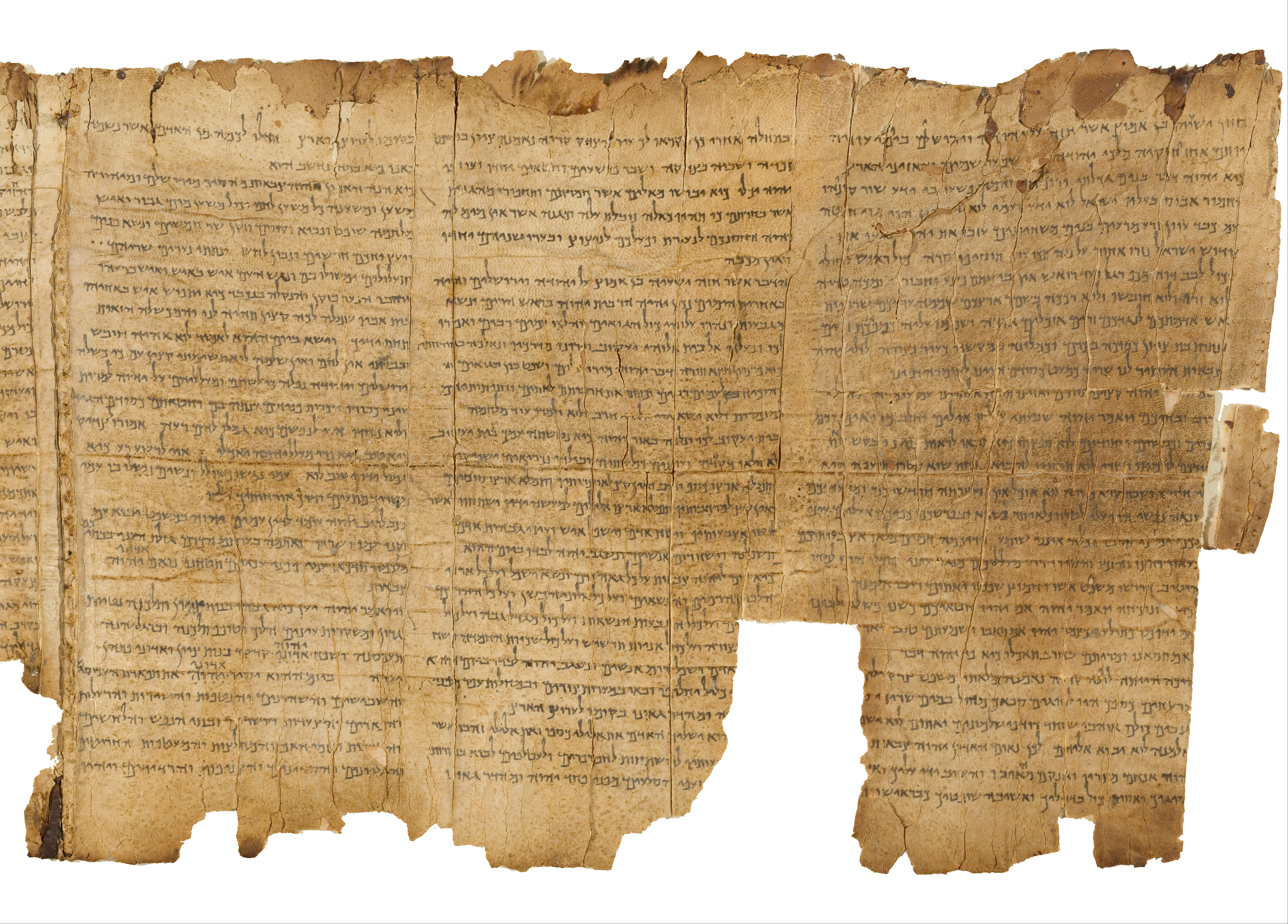
Radiocarbon dating helped verify the authenticity of the Dead Sea Scrolls.

Radiocarbon dating (also referred to as carbon dating or carbon-14 dating) is a method for determining the age of an object containing organic material by using the properties of radiocarbon, a radioactive isotope of carbon.

The method was developed in the late 1940s at the University of Chicago by Willard Libby. It is based on the fact that radiocarbon (^{14}C) is constantly being created in the Earth's atmosphere by the interaction of cosmic rays with atmospheric nitrogen. The resulting ^{14}C combines with atmospheric oxygen to form radioactive carbon dioxide, which is incorporated into plants by photosynthesis; animals then acquire ^{14}C by eating the plants. When the animal or plant dies, it stops exchanging carbon with its environment, and thereafter the amount of ^{14}C it contains begins to decrease as the ^{14}C undergoes radioactive decay. Measuring the amount of ^{14}C in a sample from a dead plant or animal, such as a piece of wood or a fragment of bone, provides information that can be used to calculate when the animal or plant died. The older a sample is, the less ^{14}C there is to be detected. The half-life of ^{14}C (the period of time after which half of a given sample will have decayed) is about 5,730 years, so the oldest dates that can be reliably measured by this process date to approximately 50,000 years ago, although special preparation methods occasionally make an accurate analysis of older samples possible. Libby received the Nobel Prize in Chemistry for his work in 1960.

Research has been ongoing since the 1960s to determine the proportion of ^{14}C in the atmosphere over the past 50,000 years. The resulting data, in the form of a calibration curve, is now used to convert a given measurement of radiocarbon in a sample into an estimate of the sample's calendar age. Other corrections must be made to account for the proportion of ^{14}C in different types of organisms (fractionation), and the varying levels of ^{14}C throughout the biosphere (reservoir effects). Additional complications come from the burning of fossil fuels, such as coal and oil, and from the above-ground nuclear tests done in the 1950s and 1960s. Because the time it takes to convert biological materials to fossil fuels is substantially longer than the time it takes for their ^{14}C to decay below detectable levels, fossil fuels contain almost no ^{14}C. As a result, beginning in the late 19th century, there was a noticeable drop in the proportion of ^{14}C as the carbon dioxide generated from burning fossil fuels began to accumulate in the atmosphere. Conversely, nuclear testing increased the amount of ^{14}C in the atmosphere, which reached a maximum in about 1965 of almost double the amount present in the atmosphere prior to nuclear testing.

Measurement of radiocarbon was originally done by beta-counting devices, which counted the amount of beta radiation emitted by decaying ^{14}C atoms in a sample. More recently, accelerator mass spectrometry has become the method of choice; it counts all the ^{14}C atoms in the sample and not just the few that happen to decay during the measurements; it can therefore be used with much smaller samples (as small as individual plant seeds), and gives results much more quickly. The development of radiocarbon dating has had a profound impact on archaeology. In addition to permitting more accurate dating within archaeological sites than previous methods, it allows comparison of dates of events across great distances. Histories of archaeology often refer to its impact as the "radiocarbon revolution". Radiocarbon dating has allowed key transitions in prehistory to be dated, such as the end of the last ice age, and the beginning of the Neolithic and Bronze Age in different regions.

== History ==
In 1939, Martin Kamen and Samuel Ruben of the Radiation Laboratory at Berkeley began experiments to determine if any of the elements common in organic matter had isotopes with half-lives long enough to be of value in biomedical research. They synthesized ^{14}C using the laboratory's cyclotron accelerator and soon discovered that the atom's half-life was far longer than had been previously thought. This was followed by a prediction by Serge A. Korff, then employed at the Franklin Institute in Philadelphia, that the interaction of thermal neutrons with ^{14}N in the upper atmosphere would create ^{14}C. (Note: Korff's paper actually referred to slow neutrons, a term that since Korff's time has acquired a more specific meaning, referring to a range of neutron energies that does not overlap with thermal neutrons.) It had previously been thought that ^{14}C would be more likely to be created by deuterons interacting with ^{13}C. At some time during World War II, Willard Libby, who was then at Berkeley, learned of Korff's research and conceived the idea that it might be possible to use radiocarbon for dating.

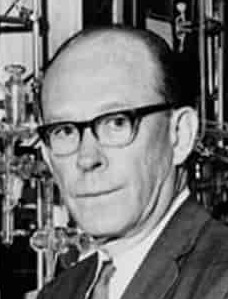
Willard Libby, the inventor of radiocarbon dating

In 1945, Libby moved to the University of Chicago, where he began his work on radiocarbon dating. He published a paper in 1946 in which he proposed that the carbon in living matter might include ^{14}C as well as non-radioactive carbon. Libby and several collaborators proceeded to experiment with methane collected from sewage works in Baltimore, and after isotopically enriching their samples they were able to demonstrate that they contained ^{14}C. By contrast, methane created from petroleum showed no radiocarbon activity because of its age. The results were summarized in a paper in Science in 1947, in which the authors commented that their results implied it would be possible to date materials containing carbon of organic origin.

Libby and James Arnold proceeded to test the radiocarbon dating theory by analyzing samples with known ages. For example, two samples taken from the tombs of two Egyptian kings, Zoser and Sneferu, independently dated to 2625 BC ± 75 years, were dated by radiocarbon measurement to an average of 2800 BC ± 250 years. These results were published in Science in December 1949. (Note: Some of Libby's original samples have since been retested, and the results, published in 2018, were generally in good agreement with Libby's original results.) Within 11 years of their announcement, more than 20 radiocarbon dating laboratories had been set up worldwide. In 1960, Libby was awarded the Nobel Prize in Chemistry for this work.

== Physical and chemical details ==
In nature, carbon exists as three isotopes. Carbon-12 (^{12}C), and carbon-13 (^{13}C) are stable and not radioactive; carbon-14 (^{14}C), also known as "radiocarbon", is radioactive. The half-life of ^{14}C (the time it takes for half of a given amount of ^{14}C to decay) is about 5,730 years, so its concentration in the atmosphere might be expected to decrease over thousands of years, but ^{14}C is constantly being produced in the lower stratosphere and upper troposphere, primarily by galactic cosmic rays, and to a lesser degree by solar cosmic rays. These cosmic rays generate neutrons as they travel through the atmosphere which can strike nitrogen-14 (^{14}N) atoms and turn them into ^{14}C. The following nuclear reaction is the main pathway by which ^{14}C is created:

n + ^{14}_{7}N → ^{14}_{6}C + p

where n represents a neutron and p represents a proton. (Note: The interaction of cosmic rays with nitrogen and oxygen below the earth's surface can also create ^{14}C, and in some circumstances (e.g. near the surface of snow accumulations, which are permeable to gases) this ^{14}C migrates into the atmosphere. However, this pathway is estimated to be responsible for less than 0.1% of the total production of ^{14}C.)

Once produced, the ^{14}C quickly combines with the oxygen (O) in the atmosphere to form first carbon monoxide (CO), and ultimately carbon dioxide (CO_{2}).

^{14}C + O_{2} → ^{14}CO + O

^{14}CO + OH → ^{14}CO_{2} + H

Carbon dioxide produced in this way diffuses in the atmosphere, is dissolved in the ocean, and is taken up by plants via photosynthesis. Animals eat the plants, and ultimately the radiocarbon is distributed throughout the biosphere. The ratio of ^{14}C to ^{12}C is approximately 1.25 parts of ^{14}C to 10^{12} parts of ^{12}C. In addition, about 1% of the carbon atoms are of the stable isotope ^{13}C.

The equation for the radioactive decay of ^{14}C is:

^{14}_{6}C → ^{14}_{7}N + e^{−} + ν̅_{e}

By emitting a beta particle (an electron, e^{−}) and an electron antineutrino (ν̅_{e}), one of the neutrons in the ^{14}C nucleus changes to a proton and the ^{14}C nucleus reverts to the stable (non-radioactive) isotope ^{14}N.

=== Principles ===
During its life, a plant or animal is in equilibrium with its surroundings by exchanging carbon either with the atmosphere or through its diet. It will, therefore, have the same proportion of ^{14}C as the atmosphere, or in the case of marine animals or plants, with the ocean. Once it dies, it ceases to acquire ^{14}C, but the ^{14}C within its biological material at that time will continue to decay, and so the ratio of ^{14}C to ^{12}C in its remains will gradually decrease. Because ^{14}C decays at a known rate, the proportion of radiocarbon can be used to determine how long it has been since a given sample stopped exchanging carbon – the older the sample, the less ^{14}C will be left.

The equation governing the decay of a radioactive isotope is:

$$N = N_0 \, e^{-\lambda t}\,$$

where N_{0} is the number of atoms of the isotope in the original sample (at time t = 0, when the organism from which the sample was taken died), and N is the number of atoms left after time t. λ is a constant that depends on the particular isotope; for a given isotope it is equal to the reciprocal of the mean-life – i.e. the average or expected time a given atom will survive before undergoing radioactive decay. The mean-life, denoted by τ, of ^{14}C is 8,267 years, (Note: The half-life of ^{14}C (which determines the mean-life) was thought to be 5568 ± 30 years in 1952. The mean-life and half-life are related by the following equation: $$T_\frac{1}{2} = 0.693 \cdot \tau$$) so the equation above can be rewritten as:

$$t = \ln(N_0/N) \cdot \text{8267 years}$$

The sample is assumed to have originally had the same ^{14}C/^{12}C ratio as the ratio in the atmosphere, and since the size of the sample is known, the total number of atoms in the sample can be calculated, yielding N_{0}, the number of ^{14}C atoms in the original sample. Measurement of N, the number of ^{14}C atoms currently in the sample, allows the calculation of t, the age of the sample, using the equation above.

The half-life of a radioactive isotope (usually denoted by t_{1/2}) is a more familiar concept than the mean-life, so although the equations above are expressed in terms of the mean-life, it is more usual to quote the value of ^{14}C's half-life than its mean-life. The currently accepted value for the half-life of ^{14}C is 5,700 ± 30 years. This means that after 5,700 years, only half of the initial ^{14}C will remain; a quarter will remain after 11,400 years; an eighth after 17,100 years; and so on.

The above calculations make several assumptions, such as that the level of ^{14}C in the atmosphere has remained constant over time. In fact, the level of ^{14}C in the atmosphere has varied significantly and as a result, the values provided by the equation above have to be corrected by using data from other sources. This is done by calibration curves (discussed below), which convert a measurement of ^{14}C in a sample into an estimated calendar age. The calculations involve several steps and include an intermediate value called the "radiocarbon age", which is the age in "radiocarbon years" of the sample: an age quoted in radiocarbon years means that no calibration curve has been used − the calculations for radiocarbon years assume that the atmospheric ^{14}C/^{12}C ratio has not changed over time.

Calculating radiocarbon ages also requires the value of the half-life for ^{14}C. In Libby's 1949 paper he used a value of 5720 ± 47 years, based on research by Engelkemeir et al. This was remarkably close to the modern value, but shortly afterwards the accepted value was revised to 5568 ± 30 years, and this value was in use for more than a decade. It was revised again in the early 1960s to 5,730 ± 40 years, which meant that many calculated dates in papers published prior to this were incorrect (the error in the half-life is about 3%). (Note: Two experimentally determined values from the early 1950s were not included in the value Libby used: ~6,090 years, and 5900 ± 250 years.) For consistency with these early papers, it was agreed at the 1962 Radiocarbon Conference in Cambridge (UK) to use the "Libby half-life" of 5568 years. Radiocarbon ages are still calculated using this half-life, and are known as "Conventional Radiocarbon Age". Since the calibration curve (IntCal) also reports past atmospheric ^{14}C concentration using this conventional age, any conventional ages calibrated against the IntCal curve will produce a correct calibrated age. When a date is quoted, the reader should be aware that if it is an uncalibrated date (a term used for dates given in radiocarbon years) it may differ substantially from the best estimate of the actual calendar date, both because it uses the wrong value for the half-life of ^{14}C, and because no correction (calibration) has been applied for the historical variation of ^{14}C in the atmosphere over time. (Note: The term "conventional radiocarbon age" is also used. The definition of radiocarbon years is as follows: the age is calculated by using the following standards: a) using the Libby half-life of 5568 years, rather than the currently accepted actual half-life of 5730 years; (b) the use of an NIST standard known as HOxII to define the activity of radiocarbon in 1950; (c) the use of 1950 as the date from which years "before present" are counted; (d) a correction for fractionation, based on a standard isotope ratio, and (e) the assumption that the ^{14}C/^{12}C ratio has not changed over time.)

=== Carbon exchange reservoir ===
Simplified version of the carbon exchange reservoir, showing proportions of carbon and relative activity of the ^{14}C in each reservoir (Note: The data on carbon percentages in each part of the reservoir is drawn from an estimate of reservoir carbon for the mid-1990s; estimates of carbon distribution during pre-industrial times are significantly different.)

Carbon is distributed throughout the atmosphere, the biosphere, and the oceans; these are referred to collectively as the carbon exchange reservoir, and each component is also referred to individually as a carbon exchange reservoir. The different elements of the carbon exchange reservoir vary in how much carbon they store, and in how long it takes for the ^{14}C generated by cosmic rays to fully mix with them. This affects the ratio of ^{14}C to ^{12}C in the different reservoirs, and hence the radiocarbon ages of samples that originated in each reservoir. The atmosphere, which is where ^{14}C is generated, contains about 1.9% of the total carbon in the reservoirs, and the ^{14}C it contains mixes in less than seven years. The ratio of ^{14}C to ^{12}C in the atmosphere is taken as the baseline for the other reservoirs: if another reservoir has a lower ratio of ^{14}C to ^{12}C, it indicates that the carbon is older and hence that either some of the ^{14}C has decayed, or the reservoir is receiving carbon that is not at the atmospheric baseline. The ocean surface is an example: it contains 2.4% of the carbon in the exchange reservoir, but there is only about 95% as much ^{14}C as would be expected if the ratio were the same as in the atmosphere. The time it takes for carbon from the atmosphere to mix with the surface ocean is only a few years, but the surface waters also receive water from the deep ocean, which has more than 90% of the carbon in the reservoir. Water in the deep ocean takes about 1,000 years to circulate back through surface waters, and so the surface waters contain a combination of older water, with depleted ^{14}C, and water recently at the surface, with ^{14}C in equilibrium with the atmosphere.

Creatures living at the ocean surface have the same ^{14}C ratios as the water they live in, and as a result of the reduced ^{14}C/^{12}C ratio, the radiocarbon age of marine life is typically about 400 years. Organisms on land are in closer equilibrium with the atmosphere and have the same ^{14}C/^{12}C ratio as the atmosphere. (Note: For marine life, the age only appears to be 400 years once a correction for fractionation is made. This effect is accounted for during calibration by using a different marine calibration curve; without this curve, modern marine life would appear to be 400 years old when radiocarbon dated. Similarly, the statement about land organisms is only true once fractionation is taken into account.) These organisms contain about 1.3% of the carbon in the reservoir; sea organisms have a mass of less than 1% of those on land and are not shown in the diagram. Accumulated dead organic matter, of both plants and animals, exceeds the mass of the biosphere by a factor of nearly 3, and since this matter is no longer exchanging carbon with its environment, it has a ^{14}C/^{12}C ratio lower than that of the biosphere.

== Dating considerations ==
The variation in the ^{14}C/^{12}C ratio in different parts of the carbon exchange reservoir means that a straightforward calculation of the age of a sample based on the amount of ^{14}C it contains will often give an incorrect result. There are several other possible sources of error that need to be considered. The errors are of four general types:

- variations in the ^{14}C/^{12}C ratio in the atmosphere, both geographically and over time;
- isotopic fractionation;
- variations in the ^{14}C/^{12}C ratio in different parts of the reservoir;
- contamination.

=== Atmospheric variation ===
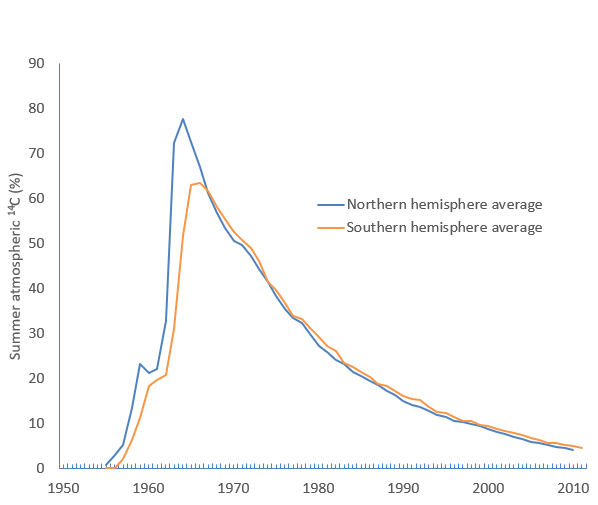
Atmospheric ^{14}C for the northern and southern hemispheres, showing percentage excess above pre-bomb levels. The Partial Test Ban Treaty went into effect on 10 October 1963.

In the early years of using the technique, it was understood that it depended on the atmospheric ^{14}C/^{12}C ratio having remained the same over the preceding few thousand years. To verify the accuracy of the method, several artefacts that were datable by other techniques were tested; the results of the testing were in reasonable agreement with the true ages of the objects. Over time, however, discrepancies began to appear between the known chronology for the oldest Egyptian dynasties and the radiocarbon dates of Egyptian artefacts. Neither the pre-existing Egyptian chronology nor the new radiocarbon dating method could be assumed to be accurate, but a third possibility was that the ^{14}C/^{12}C ratio had changed over time. The question was resolved by the study of tree rings: comparison of overlapping series of tree rings allowed the construction of a continuous sequence of tree-ring data that spanned 8,000 years. (Since that time the tree-ring data series has been extended to 13,900 years.) In the 1960s, Hans Suess was able to use the tree-ring sequence to show that the dates derived from radiocarbon were consistent with the dates assigned by Egyptologists. This was possible because although annual plants, such as corn, have a ^{14}C/^{12}C ratio that reflects the atmospheric ratio at the time they were growing, trees only add material to their outermost tree ring in any given year, while the inner tree rings don't get their ^{14}C replenished and instead start losing ^{14}C through decay. Hence each ring preserves a record of the atmospheric ^{14}C/^{12}C ratio of the year it grew in. Carbon-dating the wood from the tree rings themselves provides the check needed on the atmospheric ^{14}C/^{12}C ratio: with a sample of known date, and a measurement of the value of N (the number of atoms of ^{14}C remaining in the sample), the carbon-dating equation allows the calculation of N_{0} – the number of atoms of ^{14}C in the sample at the time the tree ring was formed – and hence the ^{14}C/^{12}C ratio in the atmosphere at that time. Equipped with the results of carbon-dating the tree rings, it became possible to construct calibration curves designed to correct the errors caused by the variation over time in the ^{14}C/^{12}C ratio. These curves are described in more detail below.

Coal and oil began to be burned in large quantities during the 19th century. Both are sufficiently old that they contain little or no detectable ^{14}C and, as a result, the CO_{2} released substantially diluted the atmospheric ^{14}C/^{12}C ratio. Dating an object from the early 20th century hence gives an apparent date older than the true date. For the same reason, ^{14}C concentrations in the neighbourhood of large cities are lower than the atmospheric average. This fossil fuel effect (also known as the Suess effect, after Hans Suess, who first reported it in 1955) would only amount to a reduction of 0.2% in ^{14}C activity if the additional carbon from fossil fuels were distributed throughout the carbon exchange reservoir, but because of the long delay in mixing with the deep ocean, the actual effect is a 3% reduction.

A much larger effect comes from above-ground nuclear testing, which released large numbers of neutrons into the atmosphere, resulting in the creation of ^{14}C. From about 1950 until 1963, when atmospheric nuclear testing was banned, it is estimated that several tonnes of ^{14}C were created. If all this extra ^{14}C had immediately been spread across the entire carbon exchange reservoir, it would have led to an increase in the ^{14}C/^{12}C ratio of only a few per cent, but the immediate effect was to almost double the amount of ^{14}C in the atmosphere, with the peak level occurring in 1964 for the northern hemisphere, and in 1966 for the southern hemisphere. The level has since dropped, as this bomb pulse or "bomb carbon" (as it is sometimes called) percolates into the rest of the reservoir.

=== Isotopic fractionation ===
Photosynthesis is the primary process by which carbon moves from the atmosphere into living things. In photosynthetic pathways ^{12}C is absorbed slightly more easily than ^{13}C, which in turn is more easily absorbed than ^{14}C. The differential uptake of the three carbon isotopes leads to ^{13}C/^{12}C and ^{14}C/^{12}C ratios in plants that differ from the ratios in the atmosphere. This effect is known as isotopic fractionation.

To determine the degree of fractionation that takes place in a given plant, the amounts of both ^{12}C and ^{13}C isotopes are measured, and the resulting ^{13}C/^{12}C ratio is then compared to a standard ratio known as PDB. (Note: "PDB" stands for "Pee Dee Belemnite", a fossil from the Pee Dee formation in South Carolina.) The ^{13}C/^{12}C ratio is used instead of ^{14}C/^{12}C because the former is much easier to measure, and the latter can be easily derived: the depletion of ^{13}C relative to ^{12}C is proportional to the difference in the atomic masses of the two isotopes, so the depletion for ^{14}C is twice the depletion of ^{13}C. The fractionation of ^{13}C, known as δ^{13}C, is calculated as follows:

$\delta \ce{^{13}C} = \left( \frac{\left( \frac{\ce{^{13}C}}{\ce{^{12}C}} \right)_{\text{sample}}}{\left( \frac{\ce{^{13}C}}{\ce{^{12}C}} \right)_{\text{standard}}} - 1 \right) \times 1000$ ‰

where the ‰ sign indicates parts per thousand. Because the PDB standard contains an unusually high proportion of ^{13}C, (Note: The PDB value is 11.2372‰.) most measured δ^{13}C values are negative.

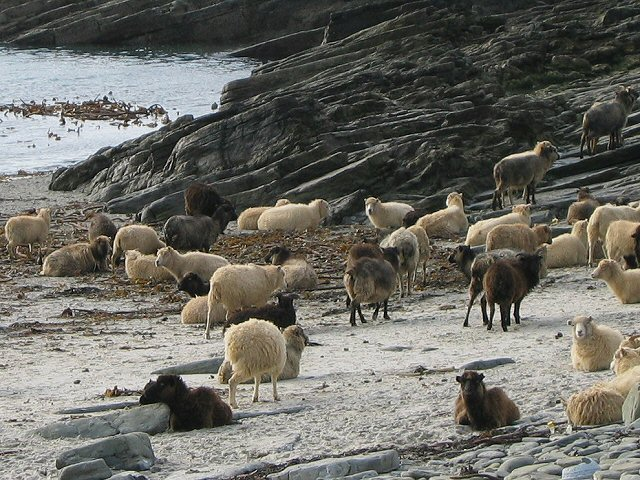
North Ronaldsay sheep on the beach in North Ronaldsay, Scotland. In the winter, these sheep eat seaweed, which has a higher δ^{13}C content than grass; samples from these sheep have a δ^{13}C value of about −13‰, which is much higher than for sheep that feed on grasses.

| Material | Typical δ^{13}C range |
|---|---|
| PDB | 0‰ |
| Marine plankton | −22‰ to −17‰ |
| C3 plants | −30‰ to −22‰ |
| C4 plants | −15‰ to −9‰ |
| Atmospheric CO_{2} | −8‰ |
| Marine CO_{2} | −32‰ to −13‰ |

For marine organisms, the details of the photosynthesis reactions are less well understood, and the δ^{13}C values for marine photosynthetic organisms are dependent on temperature. At higher temperatures, CO_{2} has poor solubility in water, which means there is less CO_{2} available for the photosynthetic reactions. Under these conditions, fractionation is reduced, and at temperatures above 14 °C the δ^{13}C values are correspondingly higher, while at lower temperatures, CO_{2} becomes more soluble and hence more available to marine organisms.

The δ^{13}C value for animals depends on their diet. An animal that eats food with high δ^{13}C values will have a higher δ^{13}C than one that eats food with lower δ^{13}C values. The animal's own biochemical processes can also impact the results: for example, both bone minerals and bone collagen typically have a higher concentration of ^{13}C than is found in the animal's diet, though for different biochemical reasons. The enrichment of bone ^{13}C also implies that excreted material is depleted in ^{13}C relative to the diet.

Since ^{13}C makes up about 1% of the carbon in a sample, the ^{13}C/^{12}C ratio can be accurately measured by mass spectrometry. Typical values of δ^{13}C have been found by experiment for many plants, as well as for different parts of animals such as bone collagen, but when dating a given sample it is better to determine the δ^{13}C value for that sample directly than to rely on the published values.

The carbon exchange between atmospheric CO_{2} and carbonate at the ocean surface is also subject to fractionation, with ^{14}C in the atmosphere more likely than ^{12}C to dissolve in the ocean. The result is an overall increase in the ^{14}C/^{12}C ratio in the ocean of 1.5%, relative to the ^{14}C/^{12}C ratio in the atmosphere. This increase in ^{14}C concentration almost exactly cancels out the decrease caused by the upwelling of water (containing old, and hence ^{14}C-depleted, carbon) from the deep ocean, so that direct measurements of ^{14}C radiation are similar to measurements for the rest of the biosphere. Correcting for isotopic fractionation, as is done for all radiocarbon dates to allow comparison between results from different parts of the biosphere, gives an apparent age of about 400 years for ocean surface water.

=== Reservoir effects ===
Libby's original exchange reservoir hypothesis assumed that the ^{14}C/^{12}C ratio in the exchange reservoir is constant all over the world, but it has since been discovered that there are several causes of variation in the ratio across the reservoir.

==== Marine effect ====
The CO_{2} in the atmosphere transfers to the ocean by dissolving in the surface water as carbonate and bicarbonate ions; at the same time the carbonate ions in the water are returning to the air as CO_{2}. This exchange process brings ^{14}C from the atmosphere into the surface waters of the ocean, but the ^{14}C thus introduced takes a long time to percolate through the entire volume of the ocean. The deepest parts of the ocean mix very slowly with the surface waters, and the mixing is uneven. The main mechanism that brings deep water to the surface is upwelling, which is more common in regions closer to the equator. Upwelling is also influenced by factors such as the topography of the local ocean bottom and coastlines, the climate, and wind patterns. Overall, the mixing of deep and surface waters takes far longer than the mixing of atmospheric CO_{2} with the surface waters, and as a result water from some deep ocean areas has an apparent radiocarbon age of several thousand years. Upwelling mixes this "old" water with the surface water, giving the surface water an apparent age of about several hundred years (after correcting for fractionation). This effect is not uniform – the average effect is about 400 years, but there are local deviations of several hundred years for areas that are geographically close to each other. These deviations can be accounted for in calibration, and users of software such as CALIB can provide as an input the appropriate correction for the location of their samples. The effect also applies to marine organisms such as shells, and marine mammals such as whales and seals, which have radiocarbon ages that appear to be hundreds of years old.

==== Hemisphere effect ====
The northern and southern hemispheres have atmospheric circulation systems that are sufficiently independent of each other that there is a noticeable time lag in mixing between the two. The atmospheric ^{14}C/^{12}C ratio is lower in the southern hemisphere, with an apparent additional age of about 40 years for radiocarbon results from the south as compared to the north. (Note: Two recent estimates included 8–80 radiocarbon years over the last 1000 years, with an average of 41 ± 14 years; and −2 to 83 radiocarbon years over the last 2000 years, with an average of 44 ± 17 years. For older datasets an offset of about 50 years has been estimated.) This is because the greater surface area of ocean in the southern hemisphere means that there is more carbon exchanged between the ocean and the atmosphere than in the north. Since the surface ocean is depleted in ^{14}C because of the marine effect, ^{14}C is removed from the southern atmosphere more quickly than in the north. The effect is strengthened by strong upwelling around Antarctica.

==== Other effects ====
If the carbon in freshwater is partly acquired from aged carbon, such as rocks, then the result will be a reduction in the ^{14}C/^{12}C ratio in the water. For example, rivers that pass over limestone, which is mostly composed of calcium carbonate, will acquire carbonate ions. Similarly, groundwater can contain carbon derived from the rocks through which it has passed. These rocks are usually so old that they no longer contain any measurable ^{14}C, so this carbon lowers the ^{14}C/^{12}C ratio of the water it enters, which can lead to apparent ages of thousands of years for both the affected water and the plants and freshwater organisms that live in it. This is known as the hard water effect because it is often associated with calcium ions, which are characteristic of hard water; other sources of carbon such as humus can produce similar results, and can also reduce the apparent age if they are of more recent origin than the sample. The effect varies greatly and there is no general offset that can be applied; additional research is usually needed to determine the size of the offset, for example by comparing the radiocarbon age of deposited freshwater shells with associated organic material.

Volcanic eruptions eject large amounts of carbon into the air. The carbon is of geological origin and has no detectable ^{14}C, so the ^{14}C/^{12}C ratio near the volcano is depressed relative to surrounding areas. Dormant volcanoes can also emit aged carbon. Plants that photosynthesize this carbon also have lower ^{14}C/^{12}C ratios: for example, plants in the neighbourhood of the Furnas caldera in the Azores were found to have apparent ages that ranged from 250 years to 3320 years.

=== Contamination ===
Any addition of carbon to a sample of a different age will cause the measured date to be inaccurate. Contamination with modern carbon causes a sample to appear to be younger than it really is: the effect is greater for older samples. If a sample that is 17,000 years old is contaminated so that 1% of the sample is modern carbon, it will appear to be 600 years younger; for a sample that is 34,000 years old, the same amount of contamination would cause an error of 4,000 years. Contamination with old carbon, with no remaining ^{14}C, causes an error in the other direction independent of age – a sample contaminated with 1% old carbon will appear to be about 80 years older than it truly is, regardless of the date of the sample.

== Samples ==
Samples for dating need to be converted into a form suitable for measuring the ^{14}C content; this can mean conversion to gaseous, liquid, or solid form, depending on the measurement technique to be used. Before this can be done, the sample must be treated to remove any contamination and any unwanted constituents. This includes removing visible contaminants, such as rootlets that may have penetrated the sample since its burial. Alkali and acid washes can be used to remove humic acid and carbonate contamination, but care has to be taken to avoid removing the part of the sample that contains the carbon to be tested.

=== Material considerations ===
- It is common to reduce a wood sample to just the cellulose component before testing, but since this can reduce the volume of the sample to 20% of its original size, testing of the whole wood is often performed as well. Charcoal is often tested but is likely to need treatment to remove contaminants.
- Unburnt bone can be tested; it is usual to date it using collagen, the protein fraction that remains after washing away the bone's structural material. Hydroxyproline, one of the constituent amino acids in bone, was once thought to be a reliable indicator as it was not known to occur except in bone, but it has since been detected in groundwater.
- For burnt bone, testability depends on the conditions under which the bone was burnt. If the bone was heated under reducing conditions, it (and associated organic matter) may have been carbonized. In this case, the sample is often usable.
- Shells from both marine and land organisms consist almost entirely of calcium carbonate, either as aragonite or as calcite, or some mixture of the two. Calcium carbonate is very susceptible to dissolving and recrystallizing; the recrystallized material will contain carbon from the sample's environment, which may be of geological origin. If testing recrystallized shell is unavoidable, it is sometimes possible to identify the original shell material from a sequence of tests. It is also possible to test conchiolin, an organic protein found in shell, but it constitutes only 1–2% of shell material.
- The three major components of peat are humic acid, humins, and fulvic acid. Of these, humins give the most reliable date as they are insoluble in alkali and less likely to contain contaminants from the sample's environment. A particular difficulty with dried peat is the removal of rootlets, which are likely to be hard to distinguish from the sample material.
- Soil contains organic material, but because of the likelihood of contamination by humic acid of more recent origin, it is very difficult to get satisfactory radiocarbon dates. It is preferable to sieve the soil for fragments of organic origin, and date the fragments with methods that are tolerant of small sample sizes.
- Other materials that have been successfully dated include ivory, paper, textiles, individual seeds and grains, straw from within mud bricks, and charred food remains found in pottery.

=== Preparation and size ===
Particularly for older samples, it may be useful to enrich the amount of ^{14}C in the sample before testing. This can be done with a thermal diffusion column. The process takes about a month and requires a sample about ten times as large as would be needed otherwise, but it allows more precise measurement of the ^{14}C/^{12}C ratio in old material and extends the maximum age that can be reliably reported.

Once contamination has been removed, samples must be converted to a form suitable for the measuring technology to be used. Where gas is required, CO_{2} is widely used. For samples to be used in liquid scintillation counters, the carbon must be in liquid form; the sample is typically converted to benzene. For accelerator mass spectrometry, solid graphite targets are the most common, although gaseous CO_{2} can also be used.

The quantity of material needed for testing depends on the sample type and the technology being used. There are two types of testing technology: detectors that record radioactivity, known as beta counters, and accelerator mass spectrometers. For beta counters, a sample weighing at least 10 grams (0.35 ounces) is typically required. Accelerator mass spectrometry is much more sensitive, and samples containing as little as 0.5 milligrams of carbon can be used.

== Measurement and results ==
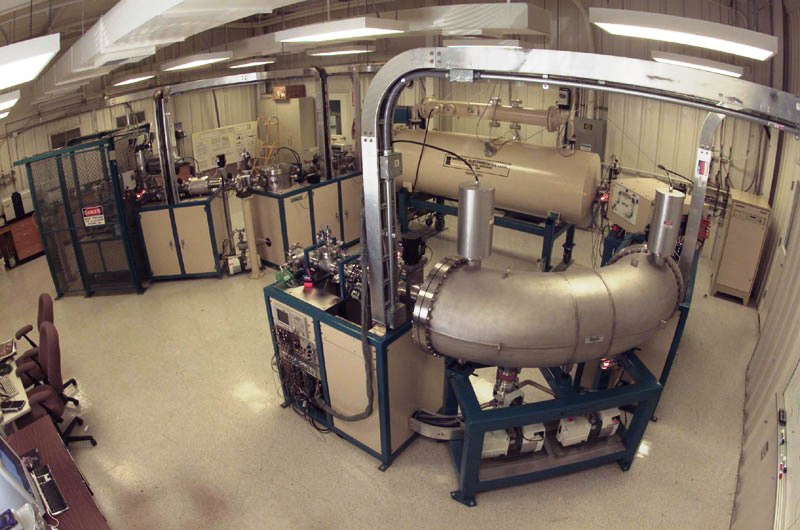
Measuring ^{14}C is now most commonly done with an accelerator mass spectrometer

For decades after Libby performed the first radiocarbon dating experiments, the only way to measure the ^{14}C in a sample was to detect the radioactive decay of individual carbon atoms. In this approach, what is measured is the activity, in number of decay events per unit mass per time period, of the sample. This method is also known as "beta counting", because it is the beta particles emitted by the decaying ^{14}C atoms that are detected. In the late 1970s an alternative approach became available: directly counting the number of ^{14}C and ^{12}C atoms in a given sample, via accelerator mass spectrometry, usually referred to as AMS. AMS counts the ^{14}C/^{12}C ratio directly, instead of the activity of the sample, but measurements of activity and ^{14}C/^{12}C ratio can be converted into each other exactly. For some time, beta counting methods were more accurate than AMS, but AMS is now more accurate and has become the method of choice for radiocarbon measurements. In addition to improved accuracy, AMS has two further significant advantages over beta counting: it can perform accurate testing on samples much too small for beta counting, and it is much faster – an accuracy of 1% can be achieved in minutes with AMS, which is far quicker than would be achievable with the older technology.

=== Beta counting ===
Libby's first detector was a Geiger counter of his own design. He converted the carbon in his sample to lamp black (soot) and coated the inner surface of a cylinder with it. This cylinder was inserted into the counter in such a way that the counting wire was inside the sample cylinder, in order that there should be no material between the sample and the wire. Any interposing material would have interfered with the detection of radioactivity, since the beta particles emitted by decaying ^{14}C are so weak that half are stopped by a 0.01 mm thickness of aluminium.

Libby's method was soon superseded by gas proportional counters, which were less affected by bomb carbon (the additional ^{14}C created by nuclear weapons testing). These counters record bursts of ionization caused by the beta particles emitted by the decaying ^{14}C atoms; the bursts are proportional to the energy of the particle, so other sources of ionization, such as background radiation, can be identified and ignored. The counters are surrounded by lead or steel shielding, to eliminate background radiation and to reduce the incidence of cosmic rays. In addition, anticoincidence detectors are used; these record events outside the counter and any event recorded simultaneously both inside and outside the counter is regarded as an extraneous event and ignored.

The other common technology used for measuring ^{14}C activity is liquid scintillation counting, which was invented in 1950, but which had to wait until the early 1960s, when efficient methods of benzene synthesis were developed, to become competitive with gas counting; after 1970 liquid counters became the more common technology choice for newly constructed dating laboratories. The counters work by detecting flashes of light caused by the beta particles emitted by ^{14}C as they interact with a fluorescing agent added to the benzene. Like gas counters, liquid scintillation counters require shielding and anticoincidence counters.

For both the gas proportional counter and liquid scintillation counter, what is measured is the number of beta particles detected in a given time period. Since the mass of the sample is known, this can be converted to a standard measure of activity in units of either counts per minute per gram of carbon (cpm/g C), or becquerels per kg (Bq/kg C, in SI units). Each measuring device is also used to measure the activity of a blank sample – a sample prepared from carbon old enough to have no activity. This provides a value for the background radiation, which must be subtracted from the measured activity of the sample being dated to get the activity attributable solely to that sample's ^{14}C. In addition, a sample with a standard activity is measured, to provide a baseline for comparison.

=== Accelerator mass spectrometry ===
Simplified schematic layout of an accelerator mass spectrometer used for counting carbon isotopes for carbon dating

AMS counts the atoms of ^{14}C and ^{12}C in a given sample, determining the ^{14}C/^{12}C ratio directly. The sample, often in the form of graphite, is made to emit C^{−} ions (carbon atoms with a single negative charge), which are injected into an accelerator. The ions are accelerated and passed through a stripper, which removes several electrons so that the ions emerge with a positive charge. The ions, which may have from 1 to 4 positive charges (C^{+} to C^{4+}), depending on the accelerator design, are then passed through a magnet that curves their path; the heavier ions are curved less than the lighter ones, so the different isotopes emerge as separate streams of ions. A particle detector then records the number of ions detected in the ^{14}C stream, but since the volume of ^{12}C (and ^{13}C, needed for calibration) is too great for individual ion detection, counts are determined by measuring the electric current created in a Faraday cup. The large positive charge induced by the stripper forces molecules such as ^{13}CH, which has a weight close enough to ^{14}C to interfere with the measurements, to dissociate, so they are not detected. Most AMS machines also measure the sample's δ^{13}C, for use in calculating the sample's radiocarbon age. The use of AMS, as opposed to simpler forms of mass spectrometry, is necessary because of the need to distinguish the carbon isotopes from other atoms or molecules that are very close in mass, such as ^{14}N and ^{13}CH. As with beta counting, both blank samples and standard samples are used. Two different kinds of blank may be measured: a sample of dead carbon that has undergone no chemical processing, to detect any machine background, and a sample known as a process blank made from dead carbon that is processed into target material in exactly the same way as the sample which is being dated. Any ^{14}C signal from the machine background blank is likely to be caused either by beams of ions that have not followed the expected path inside the detector or by carbon hydrides such as ^{12}CH_{2} or ^{13}CH. A ^{14}C signal from the process blank measures the amount of contamination introduced during the preparation of the sample. These measurements are used in the subsequent calculation of the age of the sample.

=== Calculations ===
The calculations to be performed on the measurements taken depend on the technology used, since beta counters measure the sample's radioactivity whereas AMS determines the ratio of the three different carbon isotopes in the sample.

To determine the age of a sample whose activity has been measured by beta counting, the ratio of its activity to the activity of the standard must be found. To determine this, a blank sample (of old, or dead, carbon) is measured, and a sample of known activity is measured. The additional samples allow errors such as background radiation and systematic errors in the laboratory setup to be detected and corrected for. The most common standard sample material is oxalic acid, such as the HOxII standard, 1,000 lb of which was prepared by the National Institute of Standards and Technology (NIST) in 1977 from French beet harvests.

The results from AMS testing are in the form of ratios of ^{12}C, ^{13}C, and ^{14}C, which are used to calculate Fm, the "fraction modern". This is defined as the ratio between the ^{14}C/^{12}C ratio in the sample and the ^{14}C/^{12}C ratio in modern carbon, which is in turn defined as the ^{14}C/^{12}C ratio that would have been measured in 1950 had there been no fossil fuel effect.

Both beta counting and AMS results have to be corrected for fractionation. This is necessary because different materials of the same age, which because of fractionation have naturally different ^{14}C/^{12}C ratios, will appear to be of different ages because the ^{14}C/^{12}C ratio is taken as the indicator of age. To avoid this, all radiocarbon measurements are converted to the measurement that would have been seen had the sample been made of wood, which has a known δ^{13}C value of −25‰.

Once the corrected ^{14}C/^{12}C ratio is known, a "radiocarbon age" is calculated using:

$$\text{Age} = - \ln (\text{Fm})\cdot 8033\text{ years}$$

The calculation uses 8,033 years, the mean-life derived from Libby's half-life of 5,568 years, not 8,267 years, the mean-life derived from the more accurate modern value of 5,730 years. Libby's value for the half-life is used to maintain consistency with early radiocarbon testing results; calibration curves include a correction for this, so the accuracy of final reported calendar ages is not affected.

=== Errors and reliability ===
The reliability of the results can be improved by lengthening the testing time. For example, if counting beta decays for 250 minutes is enough to give an error of ± 80 years, with 68% confidence, then doubling the counting time to 500 minutes will allow a sample with only half as much ^{14}C to be measured with the same error term of 80 years.

Radiocarbon dating is generally limited to dating samples no more than 50,000 years old, as samples older than that have insufficient ^{14}C to be measurable. Older dates have been obtained by using special sample preparation techniques, large samples, and very long measurement times. These techniques can allow measurement of dates up to 60,000 and in some cases up to 75,000 years before the present.

Radiocarbon dates are generally presented with a range of one standard deviation (usually represented by the Greek letter sigma as 1σ) on either side of the mean. However, a date range of 1σ represents only a 68% confidence level, so the true age of the object being measured may lie outside the range of dates quoted. This was demonstrated in 1970 by an experiment run by the British Museum radiocarbon laboratory, in which weekly measurements were taken on the same sample for six months. The results varied widely (though consistently with a normal distribution of errors in the measurements), and included multiple date ranges (of 1σ confidence) that did not overlap with each other. The measurements included one with a range from about 4,250 to about 4,390 years ago, and another with a range from about 4,520 to about 4,690.

Errors in procedure can also lead to errors in the results. If 1% of the benzene in a modern reference sample accidentally evaporates, scintillation counting will give a radiocarbon age that is too young by about 80 years.

=== Calibration ===
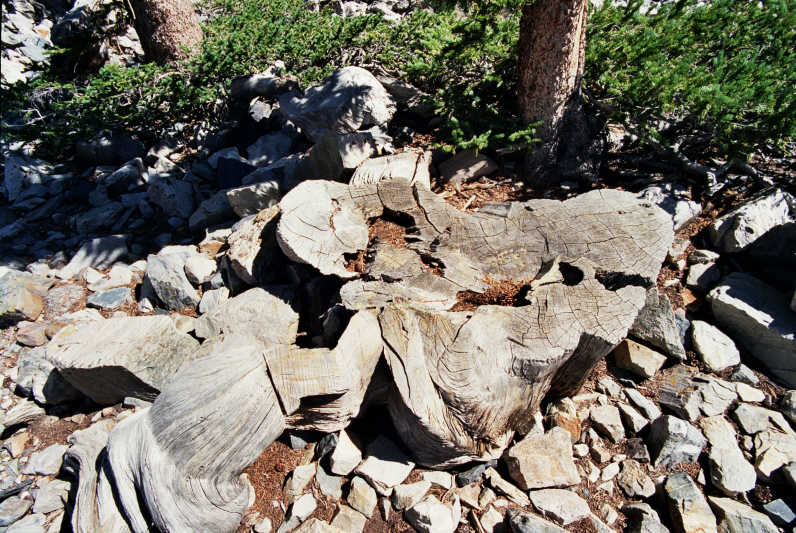
The stump of a very old bristlecone pine. Tree rings from these trees (among others) are used in building calibration curves.

The calculations given above produce dates in radiocarbon years: i.e. dates that represent the age the sample would be if the ^{14}C/^{12}C ratio had been constant historically. Although Libby had pointed out as early as 1955 the possibility that this assumption was incorrect, it was not until discrepancies began to accumulate between measured ages and known historical dates for artefacts that it became clear that a correction would need to be applied to radiocarbon ages to obtain calendar dates.

To produce a curve that can be used to relate calendar years to radiocarbon years, a sequence of securely dated samples is needed which can be tested to determine their radiocarbon age. The study of tree rings led to the first such sequence: individual pieces of wood show characteristic sequences of rings that vary in thickness because of environmental factors such as the amount of rainfall in a given year. These factors affect all trees in an area, so examining tree-ring sequences from old wood allows the identification of overlapping sequences. In this way, an uninterrupted sequence of tree rings can be extended far into the past. The first such published sequence, based on bristlecone pine tree rings, was created by Wesley Ferguson. Hans Suess used this data to publish the first calibration curve for radiocarbon dating in 1967. The curve showed two types of variation from the straight line: a long term fluctuation with a period of about 9,000 years, and a shorter-term variation, often referred to as "wiggles", with a period of decades. Suess said he drew the line showing the wiggles by "cosmic schwung", by which he meant that the variations were caused by extraterrestrial forces. It was unclear for some time whether the wiggles were real or not, but they are now well-established. These short term fluctuations in the calibration curve are now known as de Vries effects, after Hessel de Vries.

A calibration curve is used by taking the radiocarbon date reported by a laboratory and reading across from that date on the vertical axis of the graph. The point where this horizontal line intersects the curve will give the calendar age of the sample on the horizontal axis. This is the reverse of the way the curve is constructed: a point on the graph is derived from a sample of known age, such as a tree ring; when it is tested, the resulting radiocarbon age gives a data point for the graph.

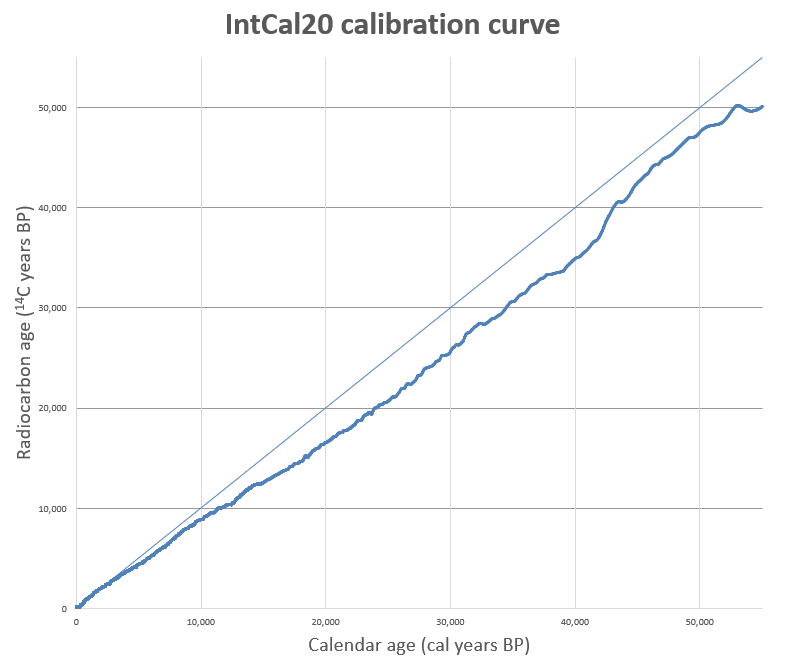
The Northern hemisphere curve from IntCal20. As of 2020, this is the most recent version of the standard calibration curve. The diagonal line shows where the curve would lie if radiocarbon ages and calendar ages were the same.

Over the next thirty years many calibration curves were published using a variety of methods and statistical approaches. These were superseded by the IntCal series of curves, beginning with IntCal98, published in 1998, and updated in 2004, 2009, 2013, and 2020. The improvements to these curves are based on new data gathered from tree rings, varves, coral, plant macrofossils, speleothems, and foraminifera. There are separate curves for the northern hemisphere (IntCal20) and southern hemisphere (SHCal20), as they differ systematically because of the hemisphere effect. The continuous sequence of tree-ring dates for the northern hemisphere goes back to 13,910 BP as of 2020, and this provides close to annual dating for IntCal20 much of the period, reduced where there are calibration plateaus, and increased when short term ^{14}C spikes due to Miyake events provide additional correlation. Radiocarbon dating earlier than the continuous tree ring sequence relies on correlation with more approximate records. SHCal20 is based on independent data where possible and derived from the northern curve by adding the average offset for the southern hemisphere where no direct data was available. There is also a separate marine calibration curve, MARINE20. For a set of samples forming a sequence with a known separation in time, these samples form a subset of the calibration curve. The sequence can be compared to the calibration curve and the best match to the sequence established. This "wiggle-matching" technique can lead to more precise dating than is possible with individual radiocarbon dates. Wiggle-matching can be used in places where there is a plateau on the calibration curve, (Note: A plateau in the calibration curve occurs when the ratio of ^{14}C/^{12}C in the atmosphere decreases at the same rate as the reduction due to radiocarbon decay in the sample. For example, there was a plateau between around 750 and 400 BCE (named the Hallstatt plateau), which makes radiocarbon dates less accurate for samples dating to this period.) and hence can provide a much more accurate date than the intercept or probability methods are able to produce. The technique is not restricted to tree rings; for example, a stratified tephra sequence in New Zealand, believed to predate human colonization of the islands, has been dated to 1314 AD ± 12 years by wiggle-matching. The wiggles also mean that reading a date from a calibration curve can give more than one answer: this occurs when the curve wiggles up and down enough that the radiocarbon age intercepts the curve in more than one place, which may lead to a radiocarbon result being reported as two separate age ranges, corresponding to the two parts of the curve that the radiocarbon age intercepted.

Bayesian statistical techniques can be applied when there are several radiocarbon dates to be calibrated. For example, if a series of radiocarbon dates is taken from different levels in a stratigraphic sequence, Bayesian analysis can be used to evaluate dates which are outliers and can calculate improved probability distributions, based on the prior information that the sequence should be ordered in time. When Bayesian analysis was introduced, its use was limited by the need to use mainframe computers to perform the calculations, but the technique has since been implemented on programs available for personal computers, such as OxCal.

=== Reporting dates ===
Several formats for citing radiocarbon results have been used since the first samples were dated. As of 2019, the standard format required by the journal Radiocarbon is as follows.

Uncalibrated dates should be reported as "laboratory: $\ce{{}^14C}$ year ± range BP", where:

- laboratory identifies the laboratory that tested the sample, and the sample ID
- $\ce{{}^14C}$ year is the laboratory's determination of the age of the sample, in radiocarbon years
- range is the laboratory's estimate of the error in the age, at 1σ confidence.
- 'BP' stands for "before present", referring to a reference date of 1950, so that "500 BP" means the year AD 1450.

For example, the uncalibrated date "UtC-2020: 3510 ± 60 BP" indicates that the sample was tested by the Utrecht van der Graaff Laboratorium ("UtC"), where it has a sample number of "2020", and that the uncalibrated age is 3510 years before present, ± 60 years. Related forms are sometimes used: for example, "2.3 ka BP" means 2,300 radiocarbon years before present (i.e. 350 BC), and "^{14}C yr BP" might be used to distinguish the uncalibrated date from a date derived from another dating method such as thermoluminescence.

Calibrated ^{14}C dates are frequently reported as "cal BP", "cal BC", or "cal AD", again with 'BP' referring to the year 1950 as the zero date. Radiocarbon gives two options for reporting calibrated dates. A common format is "cal date-range confidence", where:

- date-range is the range of dates corresponding to the given confidence level
- confidence indicates the confidence level for the given date range.

For example, "cal 1220–1281 AD (1σ)" means a calibrated date for which the true date lies between AD 1220 and AD 1281, with a confidence level of '1 sigma', or approximately 68%. Calibrated dates can also be expressed as "BP" instead of using "BC" and "AD". The curve used to calibrate the results should be the latest available IntCal curve. Calibrated dates should also identify any programs, such as OxCal, used to perform the calibration. In addition, an article in Radiocarbon in 2014 about radiocarbon date reporting conventions recommends that information should be provided about sample treatment, including the sample material, pretreatment methods, and quality control measurements; that the citation to the software used for calibration should specify the version number and any options or models used; and that the calibrated date should be given with the associated probabilities for each range.

== Use in archaeology ==
=== Interpretation ===
A key concept in interpreting radiocarbon dates is archaeological association: what is the true relationship between two or more objects at an archaeological site? It frequently happens that a sample for radiocarbon dating can be taken directly from the object of interest, but there are also many cases where this is not possible. Metal grave goods, for example, cannot be radiocarbon dated, but they may be found in a grave with a coffin, charcoal, or other material which can be assumed to have been deposited at the same time. In these cases, a date for the coffin or charcoal is indicative of the date of deposition of the grave goods, because of the direct functional relationship between the two. There are also cases where there is no functional relationship, but the association is reasonably strong: for example, a layer of charcoal in a rubbish pit provides a date which has a relationship to the rubbish pit.

Contamination is of particular concern when dating very old material obtained from archaeological excavations and great care is needed in the specimen selection and preparation. In 2014, Thomas Higham and co-workers suggested that many of the dates published for Neanderthal artifacts are too recent because of contamination by "young carbon".

As a tree grows, only the outermost tree ring exchanges carbon with its environment, so the age measured for a wood sample depends on where the sample is taken from. This means that radiocarbon dates on wood samples can be older than the date at which the tree was felled. In addition, if a piece of wood is used for multiple purposes, there may be a significant delay between the felling of the tree and the final use in the context in which it is found. This is often referred to as the "old wood" problem. One example is the Bronze Age trackway at Withy Bed Copse, in England; the trackway was built from wood that had clearly been worked for other purposes before being re-used in the trackway. Another example is driftwood, which may be used as construction material. It is not always possible to recognize re-use. Other materials can present the same problem: for example, bitumen is known to have been used by some Neolithic communities to waterproof baskets; the bitumen's radiocarbon age will be greater than is measurable by the laboratory, regardless of the actual age of the context, so testing the basket material will give a misleading age if care is not taken. A separate issue, related to re-use, is that of lengthy use, or delayed deposition. For example, a wooden object that remains in use for a lengthy period will have an apparent age greater than the actual age of the context in which it is deposited.

=== Notable applications ===
==== Pleistocene/Holocene boundary in Two Creeks Fossil Forest ====
The Pleistocene is a geological epoch that began about 2.6 million years ago. The Holocene, the current geological epoch, begins about 11,700 years ago when the Pleistocene ends. Establishing the date of this boundary − which is defined by sharp climatic warming − as accurately as possible has been a goal of geologists for much of the 20th century. At Two Creeks, in Wisconsin, a fossil forest was discovered (Two Creeks Buried Forest State Natural Area), and subsequent research determined that the destruction of the forest was caused by the Valders ice readvance, the last southward movement of ice before the end of the Pleistocene in that area. Before the advent of radiocarbon dating, the fossilized trees had been dated by correlating sequences of annually deposited layers of sediment at Two Creeks with sequences in Scandinavia. This led to estimates that the trees were between 24,000 and 19,000 years old, and hence this was taken to be the date of the last advance of the Wisconsin glaciation before its final retreat marked the end of the Pleistocene in North America. In 1952 Libby published radiocarbon dates for several samples from the Two Creeks site and two similar sites nearby; the dates were averaged to 11,404 BP with a standard error of 350 years. This result was uncalibrated, as the need for calibration of radiocarbon ages was not yet understood. Further results over the next decade supported an average date of 11,350 BP, with the results thought to be the most accurate averaging 11,600 BP. There was initial resistance to these results on the part of Ernst Antevs, the palaeobotanist who had worked on the Scandinavian varve series, but his objections were eventually discounted by other geologists. In the 1990s samples were tested with AMS, yielding (uncalibrated) dates ranging from 11,640 BP to 11,800 BP, both with a standard error of 160 years. Subsequently, a sample from the fossil forest was used in an interlaboratory test, with results provided by over 70 laboratories. These tests produced a median age of 11,788 ± 8 BP (2σ confidence) which when calibrated gives a date range of 13,730 to 13,550 cal BP. The Two Creeks radiocarbon dates are now regarded as a key result in developing the modern understanding of North American glaciation at the end of the Pleistocene.

==== Dead Sea Scrolls ====
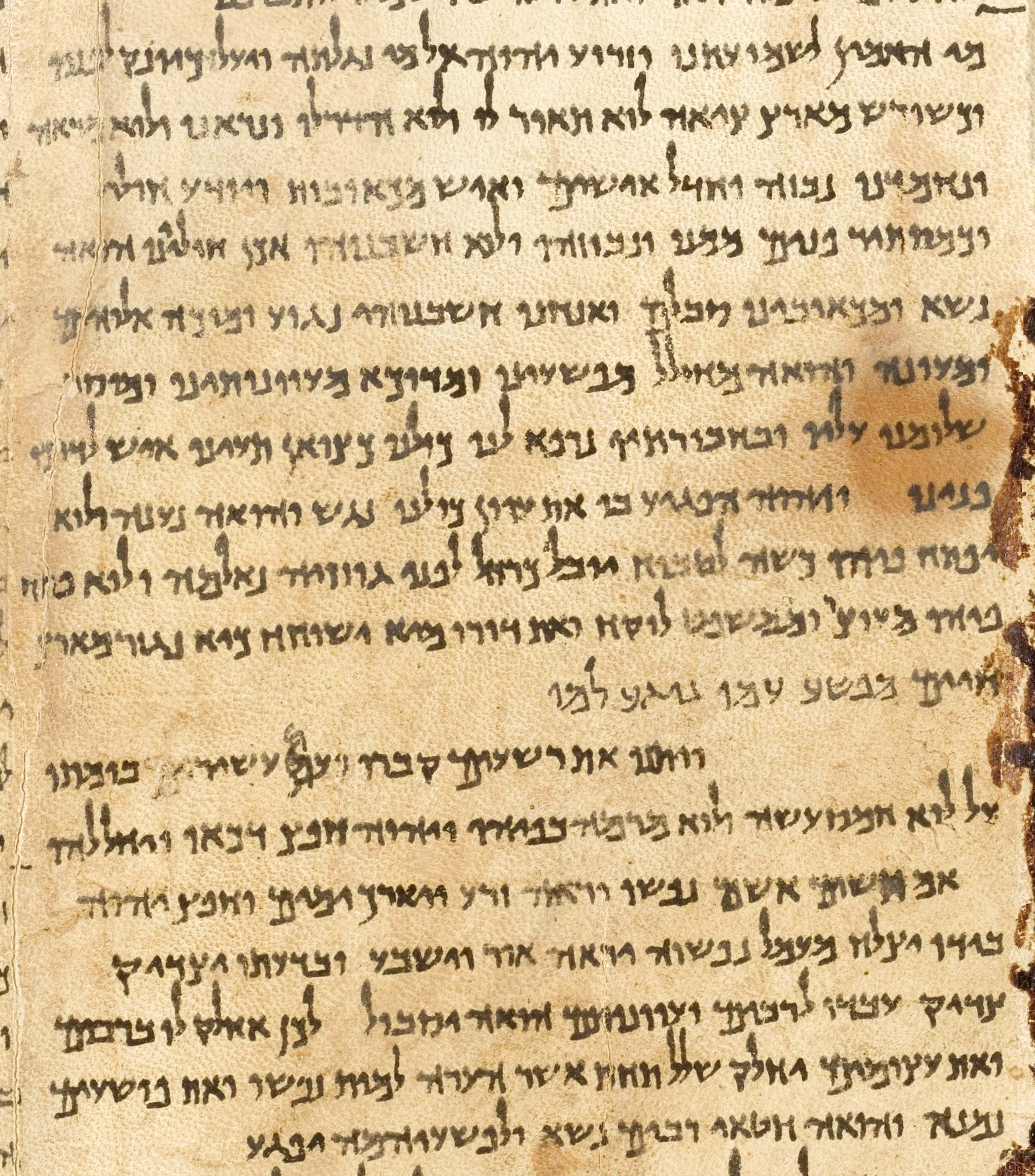
Part of the Great Isaiah Scroll, one of the Dead Sea Scrolls

In 1947, scrolls were discovered in caves near the Dead Sea that proved to contain writing in Hebrew and Aramaic, most of which are thought to have been produced by the Essenes, a small Jewish sect. These scrolls are of great significance in the study of Biblical texts because many of them contain the earliest known version of books of the Hebrew bible. A sample of the linen wrapping from one of these scrolls, the Great Isaiah Scroll, was included in a 1955 analysis by Libby, with an estimated age of 1,917 ± 200 years. Based on an analysis of the writing style, palaeographic estimates were made of the age of 21 of the scrolls, and samples from most of these, along with other scrolls which had not been palaeographically dated, were tested by two AMS laboratories in the 1990s. The results ranged in age from the early 4th century BC to the mid 4th century AD. In all but two cases the scrolls were determined to be within 100 years of the palaeographically determined age. The Isaiah scroll was included in the testing and was found to have two possible date ranges at a 2σ confidence level, because of the shape of the calibration curve at that point: there is a 15% chance that it dates from 355 to 295 BC, and an 84% chance that it dates from 210 to 45 BC. Subsequently, these dates were criticized on the grounds that before the scrolls were tested, they had been treated with modern castor oil in order to make the writing easier to read; it was argued that failure to remove the castor oil sufficiently would have caused the dates to be too young. Multiple papers have been published both supporting and opposing the criticism.

=== Impact ===
Soon after the publication of Libby's 1949 paper in Science, universities around the world began establishing radiocarbon-dating laboratories, and by the end of the 1950s there were more than 20 active ^{14}C research laboratories. It quickly became apparent that the principles of radiocarbon dating were valid, despite certain discrepancies, the causes of which then remained unknown.

The development of radiocarbon dating has had a profound impact on archaeology – often described as the "radiocarbon revolution". In the words of anthropologist R. E. Taylor, "^{14}C data made a world prehistory possible by contributing a time scale that transcends local, regional and continental boundaries". It provides more accurate dating within sites than previous methods, which usually derived either from stratigraphy or from typologies (e.g. of stone tools or pottery); it also allows comparison and synchronization of events across great distances. The advent of radiocarbon dating may even have led to better field methods in archaeology since better data recording leads to a firmer association of objects with the samples to be tested. These improved field methods were sometimes motivated by attempts to prove that a ^{14}C date was incorrect. Taylor also suggests that the availability of definite date information freed archaeologists from the need to focus so much of their energy on determining the dates of their finds, and led to an expansion of the questions archaeologists were willing to research. For example, from the 1970s questions about the evolution of human behaviour were much more frequently seen in archaeology.

The dating framework provided by radiocarbon led to a change in the prevailing view of how innovations spread through prehistoric Europe. Researchers had previously thought that many ideas spread by diffusion through the continent, or by invasions of peoples bringing new cultural ideas with them. As radiocarbon dates began to prove these ideas wrong in many instances, it became apparent that these innovations must sometimes have arisen locally. This has been described as a "second radiocarbon revolution". More broadly, the success of radiocarbon dating stimulated interest in analytical and statistical approaches to archaeological data. Taylor has also described the impact of AMS, and the ability to obtain accurate measurements from very small samples, as ushering in a third radiocarbon revolution.

Occasionally, radiocarbon dating techniques date an object of popular interest, for example, the Shroud of Turin, a piece of linen cloth thought by some to bear an image of Jesus Christ after his crucifixion. Three separate laboratories dated samples of linen from the Shroud in 1988; the results pointed to 14th-century origins, raising doubts about the shroud's authenticity as an alleged 1st-century relic.

Researchers have studied other isotopes created by cosmic rays to determine if they could also be used to assist in dating objects of archaeological interest; such isotopes include ^{3}He, ^{10}Be, ^{21}Ne, ^{26}Al, and ^{36}Cl. With the development of AMS in the 1980s it became possible to measure these isotopes precisely enough for them to be the basis of useful dating techniques, which have been primarily applied to dating rocks. Naturally occurring radioactive isotopes can also form the basis of dating methods, as with potassium–argon dating, argon–argon dating, and uranium series dating. Other dating techniques of interest to archaeologists include thermoluminescence, optically stimulated luminescence, electron spin resonance, and fission track dating, as well as techniques that depend on annual bands or layers, such as dendrochronology, tephrochronology, and varve chronology.

== Use outside archaeology ==
Archaeology is not the only field that uses radiocarbon dating. Radiocarbon dates can also be used in geology, sedimentology, and lake studies, for example. The ability to date minute samples using AMS has meant that palaeobotanists and palaeoclimatologists can use radiocarbon dating directly on pollen purified from sediment sequences, or on small quantities of plant material or charcoal. Dates on organic material recovered from strata of interest can be used to correlate strata in different locations that appear to be similar on geological grounds. Dating material from one location gives date information about the other location, and the dates are also used to place strata in the overall geological timeline.

Radiocarbon is also used to date carbon released from ecosystems, particularly to monitor the release of old carbon that was previously stored in soils as a result of human disturbance or climate change. Recent advances in field collection techniques also allow the radiocarbon dating of methane and carbon dioxide, which are important greenhouse gases.

== See also ==
- Chronological dating, archaeological chronology
  - Absolute dating
  - Relative dating
- Geochronology
- 774–775 carbon-14 spike

== Sources ==
- Aitken, M.J. (1990). Science-based Dating in Archaeology. London: Longman. ISBN 978-0-582-49309-4.
- Aitken, Martin J. (2003). "Radiocarbon dating". In Ellis, Linda (ed.). Archaeological Method and Theory. New York: Garland Publishing. pp. 505–508.
- Bianchi, Thomas S.; Canuel, Elizabeth A. (2011). Chemical Markers in Aquatic Ecosystems. Princeton: Princeton University Press. ISBN 978-0-691-13414-7.
- Bousman, C. Britt; Vierra, Bradley J. (2012). "Chronology, Environmental Setting, and Views of the Terminal Pleistocene and Early Holocene Cultural Transitions in North America". In Bousman, C. Britt; Vierra, Bradley J. (eds.). From the Pleistocene to the Holocene: Human Organization and Cultural Transformations in Prehistoric North America. College Station, Texas: Texas A&M University Press. pp. 1–15. ISBN 978-1-60344-760-7.
- Bowman, Sheridan (1995) [1990]. Radiocarbon Dating. London: British Museum Press. ISBN 978-0-7141-2047-8.
- Cronin, Thomas M. (2010). Paleoclimates: Understanding Climate Change Past and Present. New York: Columbia University Press. ISBN 978-0-231-14494-0.
- Dass, Chhabil (2007). Fundamentals of Contemporary Mass Spectrometry. Hoboken, New Jersey: John Wiley & Sons. ISBN 978-0-471-68229-5.
- Eriksson Stenström, Kristina; Skog, Göran; Georgiadou, Elisavet; Genberg, Johan; Johansson, Anette (2011). A guide to radiocarbon units and calculations. Lund: Lund University.
- Ferronsky, V.I.; Polyakov, V.A. (2012). Isotopes of the Earth's Hydrosphere. New York: Springer. ISBN 978-94-007-2855-4.
- Killick, David (2014). "Using evidence from natural sciences in archaeology". In Chapman, Robert; Alison, Wylie (eds.). Material Evidence: Learning From Archaeological Practice. Abingdon, UK: Routledge. pp. 159–172. ISBN 978-0-415-83745-3.
- L'Annunziata, Michael F. (2007). Radioactivity: Introduction and History. Amsterdam: Elsevier. ISBN 978-0-444-52715-8.
- L'Annunziata, Michael F.; Kessler, Michael J. (2012). "Liquid scintillation analysis: principles and practice". In L'Annunziata, Michael F. (ed.). Handbook of Radioactivity Analysis (3rd ed.). Oxford: Academic Press. pp. 423–573. doi:10.1016/b978-012436603-9/50010-7. ISBN 978-0-12-384873-4.
- Libby, Willard F. (1965) [1952]. Radiocarbon Dating (2nd (1955) ed.). Chicago: Phoenix.
- Macdougall, Doug (2008). Nature's Clocks: How Scientists Measure the Age of Almost Everything. Berkeley, California: University of California Press. ISBN 978-0-520-24975-2.
- Malainey, Mary E. (2010). A Consumer's Guide to Archaeological Science. New York: Springer. ISBN 978-1-4419-5704-7.
- Marra, John (2019). Hot Carbon: Carbon-14 and a Revolution in Science. Columbia University Press. ISBN 9780231186704.
- Maslin, Mark A.; Swann, George E.A. (2006). "Isotopes in marine sediments". In Leng, Melanie J. (ed.). Isotopes in Palaeoenvironmental Research. Dordrecht: Springer. pp. 227–290. doi:10.1007/1-4020-2504-1_06. ISBN 978-1-4020-2503-7.
- Mook, W.G.; Waterbolk, H.T. (1985). Handbooks for Archaeologists: No. 3: Radiocarbon Dating. Strasbourg: European Science Foundation. ISBN 978-2-903148-44-7.
- Post, Wilfred M. (2001). "Carbon cycle". In Goudie, Andrew; Cuff, David J. (eds.). Encyclopedia of Global Change: Environmental Change and Human Society, Volume 1. Oxford: Oxford University Press. pp. 127–130. ISBN 978-0-19-514518-2.
- Renfrew, Colin (2014). "Foreword". In Taylor, R.E.; Bar-Yosef, Ofer (eds.). Radiocarbon Dating. Walnut Creek, California: Left Coast Press. pp. 12–14. ISBN 978-1-59874-590-0.
- Schoeninger, Margaret J. (2010). "Diet reconstruction and ecology using stable isotope ratios". In Larsen, Clark Spencer (ed.). A Companion to Biological Anthropology. Oxford: Blackwell. pp. 445–464. doi:10.1002/9781444320039.ch25. ISBN 978-1-4051-8900-2.
- Šilar, Jan (2004). "Application of environmental radionuclides in radiochronology: Radiocarbon". In Tykva, Richard; Berg, Dieter (eds.). Man-made and Natural Radioactivity in Environmental Pollution and Radiochronology. Dordrecht: Kluwer Academic Publishers. pp. 150–179. ISBN 978-1-4020-1860-2.
- Suess, H.E. (1970). "Bristlecone-pine calibration of the radiocarbon time-scale 5200 B.C. to the present". In Olsson, Ingrid U. (ed.). Radiocarbon Variations and Absolute Chronology. New York: John Wiley & Sons. pp. 303–311.
- Taylor, R.E. (1987). Radiocarbon Dating. London: Academic Press. ISBN 978-0-12-433663-6.
- Taylor, R.E. (1997). "Radiocarbon dating". In Taylor, R.E.; Aitken, Martin J. (eds.). Chronometric Dating in Archaeology. New York: Plenum Press. pp. 65–97. ISBN 978-0-306-45715-9.
- Taylor, R.E.; Bar-Yosef, Ofer (2014). Radiocarbon Dating (2nd ed.). Walnut Creek, California: Left Coast Press. ISBN 978-1-59874-590-0.
- Terasmae, J. (1984). "Radiocarbon dating: some problems and potential developments". In Mahaney, W.C. (ed.). Quaternary Dating Methods. Amsterdam: Elsevier. pp. 1–15. ISBN 978-0-444-42392-4.
- Theodórsson, Páll (1996). Measurement of Weak Radioactivity. Singapore: World Scientific Publishing. ISBN 978-9810223151.
- Trumbore, Susan E. (1996). "Applications of accelerator mass spectrometry to soil science". In Boutton, Thomas W.; Yamasaki, Shin-ichi (eds.). Mass Spectrometry of Soils. New York: Marcel Dekker. pp. 311–340. ISBN 978-0-8247-9699-0.
- Tsipenyuk, Yuri M. (1997). Nuclear Methods in Science and Technology. Bristol, UK: Institute of Physics Publishing. ISBN 978-0750304221.
- Tuniz, C.; Zoppi, U.; Barbetti, M. (2004). "Radionuclide dating in archaeology by accelerator mass spectrometry". In Martini, M.; Milazzo, M.; Piacentini, M. (eds.). Physics Methods in Archaeometry. Amsterdam: IOS Press. pp. 385–405. ISBN 978-1-58603-424-5.
- Walker, Mike (2005). Quaternary Dating Methods (PDF). Chichester: John Wiley & Sons. ISBN 978-0-470-86927-7. Archived from the original (PDF) on 13 October 2017.
- Warneck, Peter (2000). Chemistry of the Natural Atmosphere. London: Academic Press. ISBN 978-0-12-735632-7.
- Wiebert, Anders (1995). Development of the Lund AMS System and the Evaluation of a New AMS Detection Technique. Lund: University of Lund.
