= IntCal =

Series of radiocarbon calibration curves

The last 4 IntCal curves converted to Delta notation: Delta14C is an estimate of the depletion or enrichment of oceanic or atmospheric radiocarbon concentration over time relative to the standard

IntCal is an abbreviation for 'International Calibration' and refers to both a series of radiocarbon calibration curves (with the year of issue appended) and the international group set up to provide semi-regular updates and extensions to the datasets and curves used for radiocarbon calibration.

== History ==
It was demonstrated in the late 1950s that ^{14}C levels in the atmosphere had varied in the past. It was only through developments in dendrochronology and radiocarbon dating that the construction of curves or tables for correction (or calibration) of radiocarbon ages to calendar age estimates was made possible. The first curves were published in the 1960s. Over the years a number of researchers developed and proposed other curves using different statistical methods but it was not until 1986 that the curves provided by a collaboration of the Belfast and Seattle laboratories were officially recommended at the International Radiocarbon Conference business meeting.

The term IntCal was first coined as a file name for the calibration curve in the software published in 1993. The IntCal93 curve was an update and extension of the 1986 curve. It covered from 0 to 11,940 calibrated years before present (cal BP) was based on radiocarbon measurements of tree-rings from North America, Ireland and Germany. It was extended to 21,950 cal BP with a smoothing spline of marine reservoir age corrected coral radiocarbon measurements with calendar ages derived from uranium–thorium dating (U-Th). Marine93, a curve for calibration of marine samples, such as shells, was based on an ocean-atmosphere model with IntCal93 used as atmospheric input back to 11,940 cal BP. The model data was extended with a smoothing spline of the coral data. In 1998 the atmospheric curve, IntCal98, was updated with more tree-ring measurements averaged in 10-year intervals and extended to 24,000 cal BP by appending a smoothing spline of radiocarbon dated foraminifera from annually laminated Cariaco Basin sediments and additional U-Th dated corals. The marine curve, Marine98, was also updated and a single year curve from cal AD 1510-1954 was also produced. By 1998 it was well established that there was a variable offset between northern and southern hemispheric samples, and calibration users were advised to add an offset to radiocarbon ages and uncertainties before calibrating.

In 2001 funding from the Leverhulme Trust enabled the formation of the IntCal Working Group (IWG) which met in 2002 at Queen's University Belfast (QUB) to establish criteria for calibration data and methods for curve construction and at Woods Hole Oceanographic Institute (WHOI) in 2003 to finalize methods and data to be included. In 2004 the IWG released the IntCal04 and Marine04 curves which extended to 26,000 cal BP. Due to the increasing complexity of the data available, a random walk statistical model, which included the uncertainty in both the radiocarbon ages and the calendar ages, was developed and used to produce IntCal04 and SHCal04. There were various radiocarbon datasets available beyond 26,000 cal BP, but because of disparities between them, they were not used to extend the curve further. Instead, a model curve not intended for use in calibration (NotCal04) was derived to highlight the offsets between the various data. A calibration curve for the southern hemisphere was also developed (SHCal04) using tree-ring measurements primarily from New Zealand, Tasmania and Chile. Northern hemisphere tree-rings measurements were also included with an interhemispheric radiocarbon offset applied.

In 2006, a Natural Environment Research Council grant to QUB and University of Sheffield funded refinements to the statistical methods for curve construction and an IWG meeting. The IWG extended the curves to 50,000 cal BP in 2009. The curves were updated again in 2013 with additional tree-ring, foraminifera and coral radiocarbon data as well as the addition of radiocarbon dates for leaf fragments from the annually laminated Lake Suigetsu record.

== Current IntCal curves ==
In 2020 the availability of a high-definition speleothem record from Hulu Cave in China allowed for the extension of IntCal20 back to 55,000 cal BP. The Hulu cave data served as a backbone for wiggle matching millennial length floating Kauri tree ring records, providing detail to the older portion of the IntCal curve. In addition, a large increase in single year tree-ring records provided higher resolution for the Younger Dryas as well as for the past 5000 years. A Bayesian spline method was developed for more flexible for curve construction. The southern hemisphere curve was also updated with the variation in the interhemispheric offset modelled. The Marine20 curve was constructed using an ocean-atmosphere-biosphere model forced by the IntCal20 atmospheric curve and CO_{2} levels reconstructed from ice core data.
