= Wesley Ferguson =

American academic

Wesley Ferguson (1922 – March 24, 1986) was an American academic at the Tree-Ring Research Laboratory at the University of Arizona at Tucson who studied tree-rings. He built a tree-ring sequence from bristlecone pines which was used by Hans Suess to create a calibration curve for radiocarbon dating.
