= Elizabeth Canuel =

Organic geochemist

- Education: University of North Carolina, Chapel Hill
- Scientific career
- Thesis: Seasonal variations in the sources and accumulation of organic matter in a coastal sediment (1992)

Elizabeth A. Canuel is an American chemical oceanographer known for her work on organic carbon cycling in aquatic environments. She is the Chancellor Professor of Marine Science at the College of William & Mary and is an elected fellow of the Geochemical Society and the European Association of Geochemistry.

== Education and career ==
Canuel has a B.S. in Chemistry from Stonehill College (1981) and earned her Ph.D.in Marine Science (1992) from the University of North Carolina at Chapel Hill. Following her Ph.D. she was a postdoctoral researcher at the United States Geological Survey until 1994 when she joined the faculty at the College of William & Mary. She was promoted to professor in 2006, and named Chancellor Professor in 2018.

From 2018 until 2020 Canuel was a program officer at the National Science Foundation, and she returned there in 2021.

== Research ==
Canuel's early research examined particles in the eastern tropical North Pacific Ocean, and lipid biomarkers in particles from North Carolina and San Francisco. She has examined the degradation of organic matter newly-placed on sediments, and anoxia in the Chesapeake Bay. Her research in Chesapeake Bay also considers how the source of organic matter to the bay impacts water quality. Canuel's use of stable isotopes extends to examining stable isotope ratios in plants from San Francisco Bay, the use of stable isotopes to track sources of organic matter in estuaries, how climate change will impact carbon cycling at the border between the land and the ocean and examining the age of organic matter in estuaries.

== Selected publications ==
- Cloern, James E.; Canuel, Elizabeth A.; Harris, David (May 2002). "Stable carbon and nitrogen isotope composition of aquatic and terrestrial plants of the San Francisco Bay estuarine system". Limnology and Oceanography. 47 (3): 713–729. Bibcode:2002LimOc..47..713C. doi:10.4319/lo.2002.47.3.0713. ISSN 0024-3590. S2CID 55474600.
- Bianchi, Thomas S.; Canuel, Elizabeth A. (31 December 2011). Chemical Biomarkers in Aquatic Ecosystems. doi:10.1515/9781400839100. ISBN 9781400839100.
- Dickhut, R. M.; Canuel, E. A.; Gustafson, K. E.; Liu, K.; Arzayus, K. M.; Walker, S. E.; Edgecombe, G.; Gaylor, M. O.; MacDonald, E. H. (1 November 2000). "Automotive Sources of Carcinogenic Polycyclic Aromatic Hydrocarbons Associated with Particulate Matter in the Chesapeake Bay Region". Environmental Science & Technology. 34 (21): 4635–4640. Bibcode:2000EnST...34.4635D. doi:10.1021/es000971e. ISSN 0013-936X.
- Canuel, Elizabeth A.; Martens, Christopher S. (1 May 1996). "Reactivity of recently deposited organic matter: Degradation of lipid compounds near the sediment-water interface". Geochimica et Cosmochimica Acta. 60 (10): 1793–1806. Bibcode:1996GeCoA..60.1793C. doi:10.1016/0016-7037(96)00045-2. ISSN 0016-7037.
- Canuel, Elizabeth A.; Cloern, James E.; Ringelberg, David B.; Guckert, James B.; Rau, Greg H. (January 1995). "Molecular and isotopic tracers used to examine sources of organic matter and its incorporation into the food webs of San Francisco Bay". Limnology and Oceanography. 40 (1): 67–81. Bibcode:1995LimOc..40...67C. doi:10.4319/lo.1995.40.1.0067. ISSN 0024-3590.

== Awards and honors ==
Canuel was named a Leopold fellow in 2011. She was elected a fellow of the Geochemical Society and the European Association of Geochemistry in 2016, and was named a sustaining fellow of the Association for the Sciences of Limnology and Oceanography in 2019.
