= McCrone =

McCrone is an Irish surname originating in pre 10th century Ulster, Ireland Notable people with the surname include:

- Guy McCrone (1898–1977), Scottish writer
- Josh McCrone (born 1987), Australian rugby league player
- Senga McCrone (1936–2020), Scottish bowls player
- Walter McCrone (1916–2002), American chemist

== See also ==
- McCrone report, a United Kingdom government dossier
- McCrone Agreement, an agreement regarding teachers' pay in Scotland
- McCrone Research Institute, an American microscopy research institute
