= Winding sheet (disambiguation) =

A winding sheet, or burial shroud, is a cloth in which a body is wrapped for burial.

Winding sheet may also refer to:

- Shroud of Turin, a length of linen cloth bearing the negative image of a man who is alleged to be Jesus of Nazareth
  - Feast of the Holy Winding Sheet of Christ, the day before Ash Wednesday
- The Winding Sheet, a 1990 album by American alternative rock musician Mark Lanegan
- The Winding Sheet, a 1992 film co-authored by Anna Reynolds

== See also ==
- The Emperor's Winding Sheet, a 1974 children's book by Jill Paton Walsh
- The Sea My Winding Sheet, a 1964 play by Douglas Livingstone
- Like a Winding Sheet, a 1946 short story by Ann Petry
