= Joseph Fischer (cartographer) =

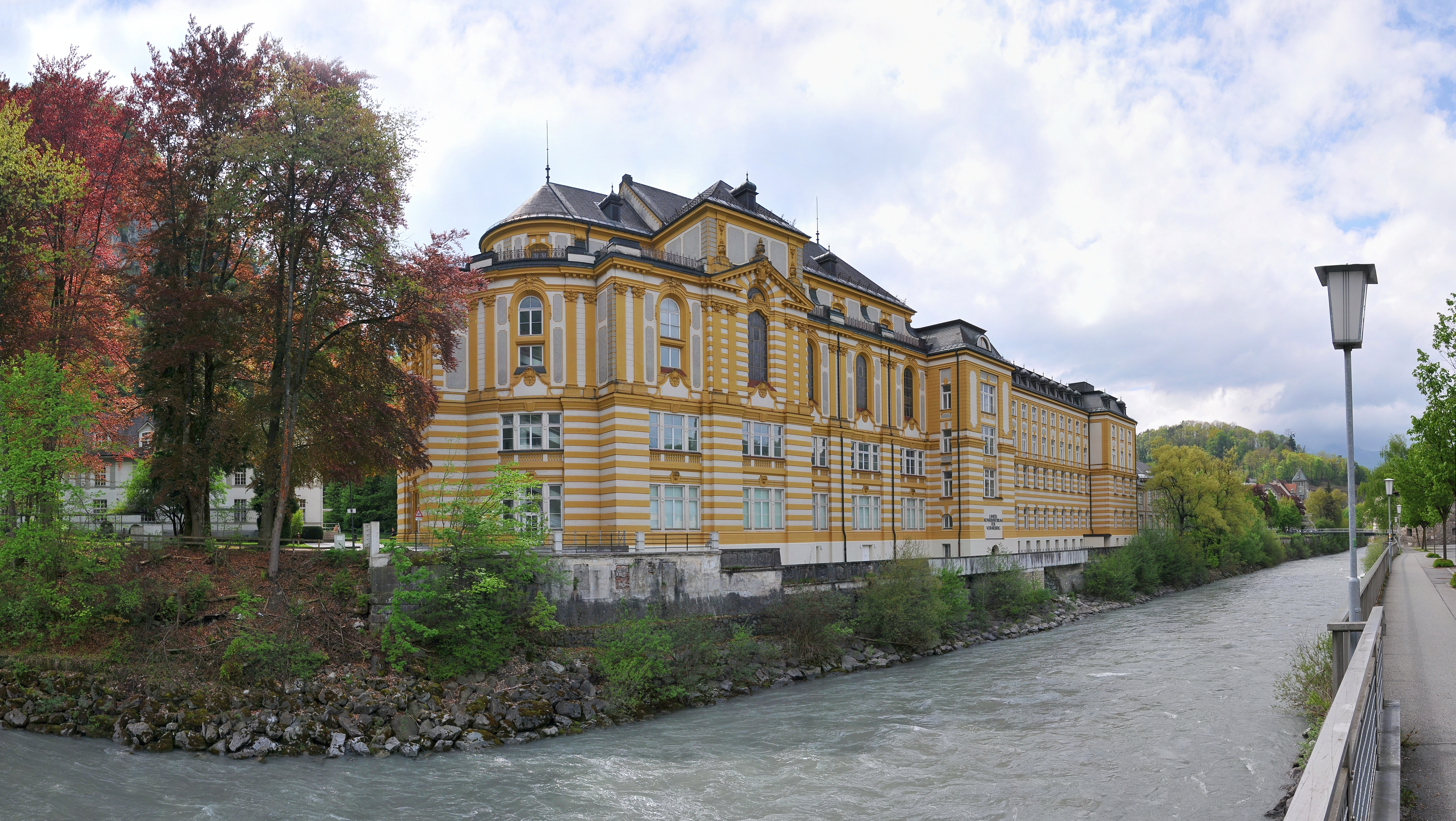
The former Stella Matutina, Fischer's home institution, now an Austrian cultural monument.

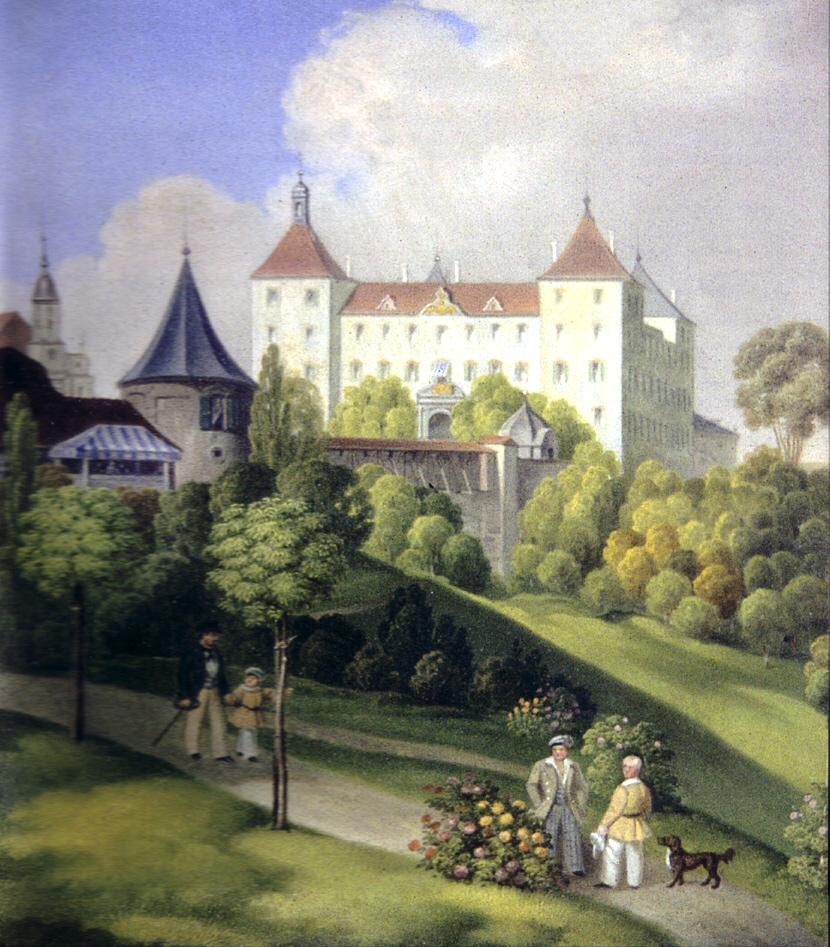
Schloss Wolfegg (Castle Wolfegg), 1855

Universalis Cosmographia, Waldseemüller's 1507 world map which was the first to show the Americas separate from Asia

Joseph Fischer, S.J. (German: Josef Fischer; 19 March 1858 – 26 October 1944) was a German clergyman and cartographer. Fischer had an eminently successful career as a cartographer, publishing old maps. In 1901, while he was investigating the Vikings' discovery of America, he accidentally discovered the long-lost map of Martin Waldseemüller, dated 1507. This map, which claims to update Ptolemy with the voyages of Amerigo Vespucci, is the first known to display the word America. The map was purchased from its owner by the United States Library of Congress in 2001 for ten million dollars.

== Biography ==
=== Early life and education ===
Fischer was born in Quadrath (Rhineland), son of Gustav Fischer (1826-1890) and Elizabeth (1819-1902). He was educated at the gymnasium in Rheine and the University of Münster, the Ludwig-Maximilians-Universität München, the University of Innsbruck, and the University of Vienna, and Jesuit scholasticates in the Netherlands, Austria and England. In 1881, he entered the Society of Jesus and was ordained to the priesthood in 1891. After 1895, he was professor of geography and history at Stella Matutina College, Feldkirch, Austria, where he taught until 1938.

=== Cartographer ===
Fischer's research encompassed Western geography and cartography from antiquity to early modern times. His special focus was on the maps of Ptolemy and Martin Waldseemüller. His scientific achievements comprise the discoveries, starting in 1891, of the maps of Martin Waldseemüller of 1507 and 1516, and of Jodocus Hondius in Schloss Wolfegg, Württemberg. From 1903 to 1904, and again from 1909 to 1910, he visited Italy, France and England as a member of the Austrian Institute of Historical Studies for the purpose of cartographical research. After Stella Matutina College was closed by the Nazis in 1938, Fischer moved to Munich and afterwards in 1941 to Schloss Wolfegg, where he oversaw the archives until his death.

=== Awards and recognition ===
He was a recognized writer and won numerous awards at home and abroad: he was a member of the Austrian Academy of Sciences, of the Pontifical Academy of Archaeology, honorary member of the Royal Geographical Society, fellow of the American Geographical Society, awarded the Carl Ritter Silver Medal of the Geographical Society of Berlin (1933), and he received an honorary doctorate from the University of Innsbruck (1935). Fischer wrote a number of articles for the Catholic Encyclopedia.

=== Vinland Map ===
Fischer’s knowledge of history, cartography and palaeography were the reasons that Norwegian-American writer and historian Kirsten Seaver considered him one of the candidates to have forged the Vinland Map. This world map, which emerged in 1957, is supposedly a pre-Columbian map that shows a portion of North America (Vinland); the authenticity of the map has been questioned by many and Seaver’s investigation concluded that Fischer was the most probable author of the map. However, subsequent research into the provenance of the Vinland map documents suggests that they are unlikely to have spent any time in Fischer's possession. Robert Baier, a forensic handwriting analyst, examined the map text and correspondence of Fisher, and his opinion was that “they are not the same writer.”

== Writings ==
His published works include:

- Die Beziehungen Kaiser Rudolfs II zu Erzherzog Matthias bis zum Vertrage von Lieben
- Der sogennante Schottwiener Vertrag vom Jahre 1600 (1897)
- Der Linzer Tag vom Jahre 1605 in seiner Bedeutung für die Österreichische Haus und Reichsgeschichte (1898)
- Fischer, Joseph (1902). Die Entdeckungen der Normannen in America: Unter besonderer berücksichtigung der kartographischen darstellungen. Ergänzungshefte zu den 'Stimmen aus Maria-Laach' no. 81 (in German). Freiburg im Breisgu [etc.]: Herder.
- Fischer, Joseph; Soulsby, Basil H. (Basil Harrington) (1903). The discoveries of the Norsemen in America: with special relation to their early cartographical representation. London: Henry Stevens, son, & Stiles.
- Die älteste Karte mit dem Namen America A.D. 1507, und die Carta Marina aus dem Jahre 1516 des M. Waldseemüller (German and English eds., 1903)
- Hondius, Jodocus (1907) [1611]. Stevenson, Edward Luther; Fischer, Joseph (eds.). Map of the World. New York: American Geographical Society of New York; Hispanic Society of America.
- Waldseemüller, Martin; Herbermann, Charles George; Fischer, Joseph; Wieser, Franz, Ritter von; Burke, Edward (1907). The Cosmographiae introductio of Martin Waldseemüller in facsimile: followed by The four voyages of Amerigo Vespucci, with their translation into English; to which are added Waldseemüller's two world maps of 1507. New York: The United States Catholic Historical Society.
- Ptolemaeus, Claudius; Fischer, Joseph (1910). Der "deutsche Ptolemäus" aus dem ende des XV. jahrhunderts (um 1490) in faksimiledruck. Hrsg. mit einer einleitung von Jos. Fischer, S. J. (in German). Strassburg: Heitz & Mündel.

He collaborated in Jahrbuch des historischen Vereins von Liechtenstein (1910) and contributed to the Innsbrucker theologische Zeitschrift, Innsbrucker Fernandeums Zeitschrift, Historical Records and Studies, Göttinger Gelehrte Anzeigen, The Catholic Encyclopedia, and Stimmen aus Maria-Laach.
