= Pierluigi Baima Bollone =

University teacher, medical examiner, sindonologist (1937-2025)

- Born: April 23, 1937; Turin, Italy
- Died: November 5, 2025 (aged 88); Turin, Italy
- Education: University of Turin
- Known for: Research on the Shroud of Turin
- Scientific career
- Fields: Forensic medicine, Criminology, Sindonology
- Workplaces: University of Turin

Pierluigi Baima Bollone (23 April 1937 – 5 November 2025) was an Italian medical examiner, criminologist, and essayist. He was professor emeritus of forensic medicine at the University of Turin, and was widely recognized as one of the world's leading experts on the Shroud of Turin (sindonology).

== Biography ==
Born in Turin in 1937, Baima Bollone graduated in medicine and surgery from the University of Turin, where he later spent his entire academic career. He served as the director of the Institute of Forensic Medicine and held the chair of forensic medicine for over three decades, later becoming professor emeritus.

As a medical examiner, he was involved in several high-profile criminal investigations and autopsies in Italy, including those concerning the murders of Police Commissioner Luigi Calabresi and politician Aldo Moro. He also authored numerous academic textbooks on forensic pathology, toxicology, criminology, as well as on christian, medieval and fascist history.

== Shroud of Turin studies ==
Baima Bollone dedicated a significant part of his life to the scientific study of the Shroud of Turin. In 1978, during a rare public display of the cloth, he was authorized to take independent thread and blood samples. His subsequent laboratory analyses concluded that the stains on the Shroud were made of actual human blood of the AB group.

He strongly supported the authenticity of the image impressed on the cloth as the actual image of Jesus Christ, also finding significant correlations with the Sudarium of Oviedo. This position placed him at the center of a major scientific debate, opposing researchers like Walter McCrone, who instead argued that the Shroud was a medieval artistic forgery.

When the results of the 1988 radiocarbon dating test suggested a medieval origin for the fabric, Baima Bollone disputed the findings. He publicly defended his own experimental data and maintained his stance over the following decades, stating that he would consider the Shroud to be the authentic burial cloth of Christ even if he were an atheist.

He founded the International Center for Sindonology (Centro Internazionale di Studi sulla Sindone) in Turin, serving as its director and later as honorary president. He published dozens of popular books and essays translating his scientific findings for the general public, defending the Shroud's compatibility with historical accounts.

In July 2026, he was posthumously credited as a co-author of a major metagenomic study published in Scientific Reports.

== Other studies ==
Beyond his medical and sindonological research, Baima Bollone was a prolific essayist who utilized an interdisciplinary approach to explore the history of anthropology, spiritualism, and criminology, frequently focusing on the figure of Cesare Lombroso.

Although he investigated also the paranormal, as well as UFO cases, he did so from a firmly catholic standpoint, maintaining a position of extreme skepticism toward the authenticity of such phenomena, while simultaneously considering people's interest in magic, parapsychology and supernatural to be scientifically significant from a social and cultural perspective.

His historical-medical investigations extended to the occult aspects of the Risorgimento (Italian unification), the Knights Templar, and Ancient Egypt. He also authored several biographical books on prominent historical figures, including Napoleon, the House of Savoy, Benito Mussolini.

== Selected bibliography ==
- La Sindone: un enigma alla prova della scienza (1978)
- Indagini identificative sui fili della Sindone (1982)
- L'impronta di Dio: alla ricerca delle reliquie di Cristo (1985)
- San Gennaro e la scienza (1989)
- Cesare Lombroso, ovvero il principio dell'irresponsabilità (1992)
- La scienza nel mondo degli spiriti (1994)
- Sindone: la prova (1998)
- La psicologia di Gesù (2003)
- Scienza e criminalità (2004)
- I delitti del mostro di Firenze (2005)
- La psicologia di Mussolini (2007)
- Torino esoterica (2009)
- Cesare Lombroso e la scoperta dell'uomo delinquente (2009)
- Esoterismo e personaggi dell'unità d'Italia: da Napoleone a Vittorio Emanuele III (2011)
- 21/12/2012: alle origini della profezia Maya (2012)
- 2015: la nuova indagine sulla Sindone (2015)
- Torino e i Savoia: dal Ducato al Regno (2019)
- Medioevo e templari in Piemonte (2021)
- La notte della prova: Sindone, la conferenza dimenticata e il verbale ritrovato (2024)

=== Translations ===
- The Shroud Under the Microscope: Forensic Examination (1998), with Stefano Zacà, St. Pauls Publishing ISBN 9780854395330.
