= Vinland Map =

Forged 'Norse' map of North America

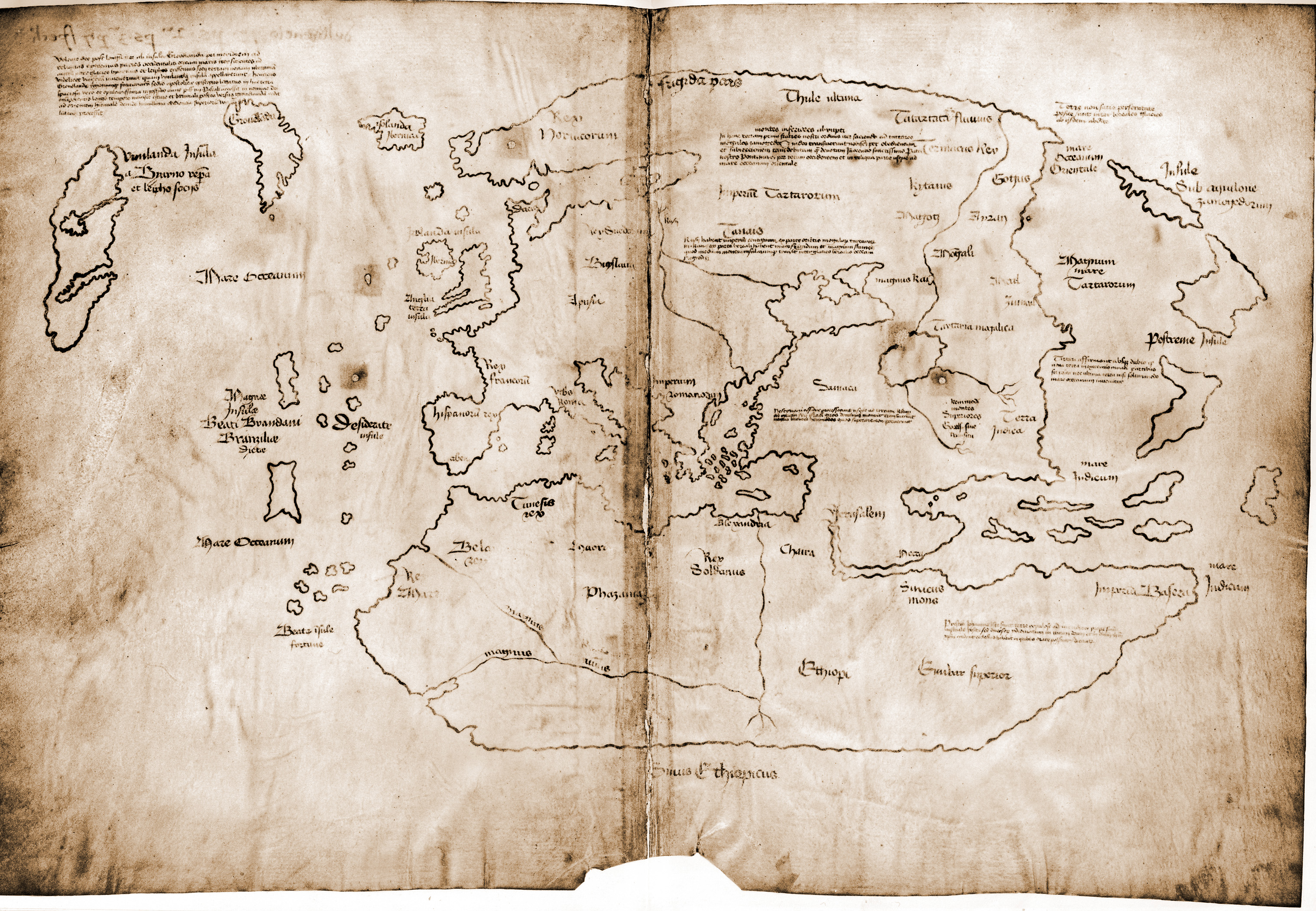
The Vinland map

The Vinland Map is a 20th-century forgery purporting to be a 15th-century mappa mundi with unique information about Norse exploration of North America. The map first came to light in 1957 and was acquired by Yale University. It became well known due to the publicity campaign which accompanied its revelation to the public as a "genuine" pre-Columbian map in 1965. In addition to showing Africa, Asia and Europe, the map depicts a landmass south-west of Greenland in the Atlantic labelled as Vinland (Vinlanda Insula).

The map describes this region as having been visited by Europeans in the 11th century. Although it was presented to the world in 1965 with an accompanying scholarly book written by British Museum and Yale University librarians, nonetheless historians of geography and medieval document specialists began to suspect that it might be a fake as soon as photographs of it became available. Later chemical analyses identified one of the major ink ingredients as a 20th-century artificial pigment.

In 2018, after several investigations and many years of debate, specialists at Yale declared that the latest scientific and historical research had conclusively established that it was a modern forgery. The map remains in Yale University's Beinecke Rare Book and Manuscript Library as part of its collection.

== Acquisition by Yale and publication ==
The Vinland map first came to light in 1957 (three years before the discovery of the Norse site at L'Anse aux Meadows in Newfoundland in 1960), bound in a slim volume with a short medieval text called the Hystoria Tartarorum (usually called in English the Tartar Relation), and was unsuccessfully offered to the British Museum by London book dealer Irving Davis on behalf of a Spanish-Italian dealer named Enzo Ferrajoli de Ry. Shortly afterwards, Ferrajoli sold the volume, for $3,500, to American dealer Laurence C. Witten II, who offered it to his alma mater, Yale University. It was initially treated with suspicion, partly because wormholes in the map and the Relation did not match. In early 1958, however, Witten's friend Thomas Marston, a Yale librarian, acquired from London book dealer Irving Davis a dilapidated medieval copy of books 21–24 of Vincent of Beauvais's encyclopedic Speculum historiale ("Historical Mirror"), written in two columns on a mix of parchment and paper sheets, with initial capitals left blank, which turned out to be the missing link; the wormholes showing that it had formerly had the map at its beginning and the Relation at its end. All traces of former ownership marks, except for a small part of a bright pink stamp which overlapped the writing on folio 223 of the Speculum, had been removed, perhaps to avoid tax liability for the former owner (although as historian Kirsten Seaver noted many years later, stamps on random book pages indicate institutional, not private ownership).

Yale was unable to afford the asking price and was concerned because Witten refused to reveal the provenance of the map, ostensibly because of the former private owner's tax concerns. Yale contacted another alumnus, Paul Mellon, who agreed to buy it (for a price later stated to be about $300,000) and donate it to the university if it could be authenticated. Recognizing its potential importance as the earliest map unambiguously showing America, Mellon insisted that its existence be kept secret until a scholarly book had been written about it. Even the three authors of the book were chosen from among the small number of people who had seen the map before Mellon bought it—two British Museum curators and Marston. Only one of them, Raleigh Ashlin Skelton, keeper of the Museum's map collection, had significant expertise relevant to the problems posed by the map. (Note: According to the recollections of the son of the Museum's then Keeper of Manuscripts, Bertram Schofield, the latter was an experienced paleographer, was also shown the map, was certain it was a fake, rejected it on grounds of provenance too and prevented the British Museum from buying it.) (His colleague George Painter, the first person to whom Davis had shown the map in 1957, was brought in for the transcription and translation of the Relation.) The secrecy almost completely ruled out consultation with specialists. Witten did his best to help during this period, answering the authors' questions and offering suggestions of his own. After years of study, the proofs of the book, The Vinland Map and the Tartar Relation, were ready by the end of 1964, and Mellon donated the map to Yale. The book was published, and the map revealed to the world, the day before Columbus Day, 1965.

== Controversies and investigations 1966–2018 ==
=== Vinland Map Conference 1966 ===
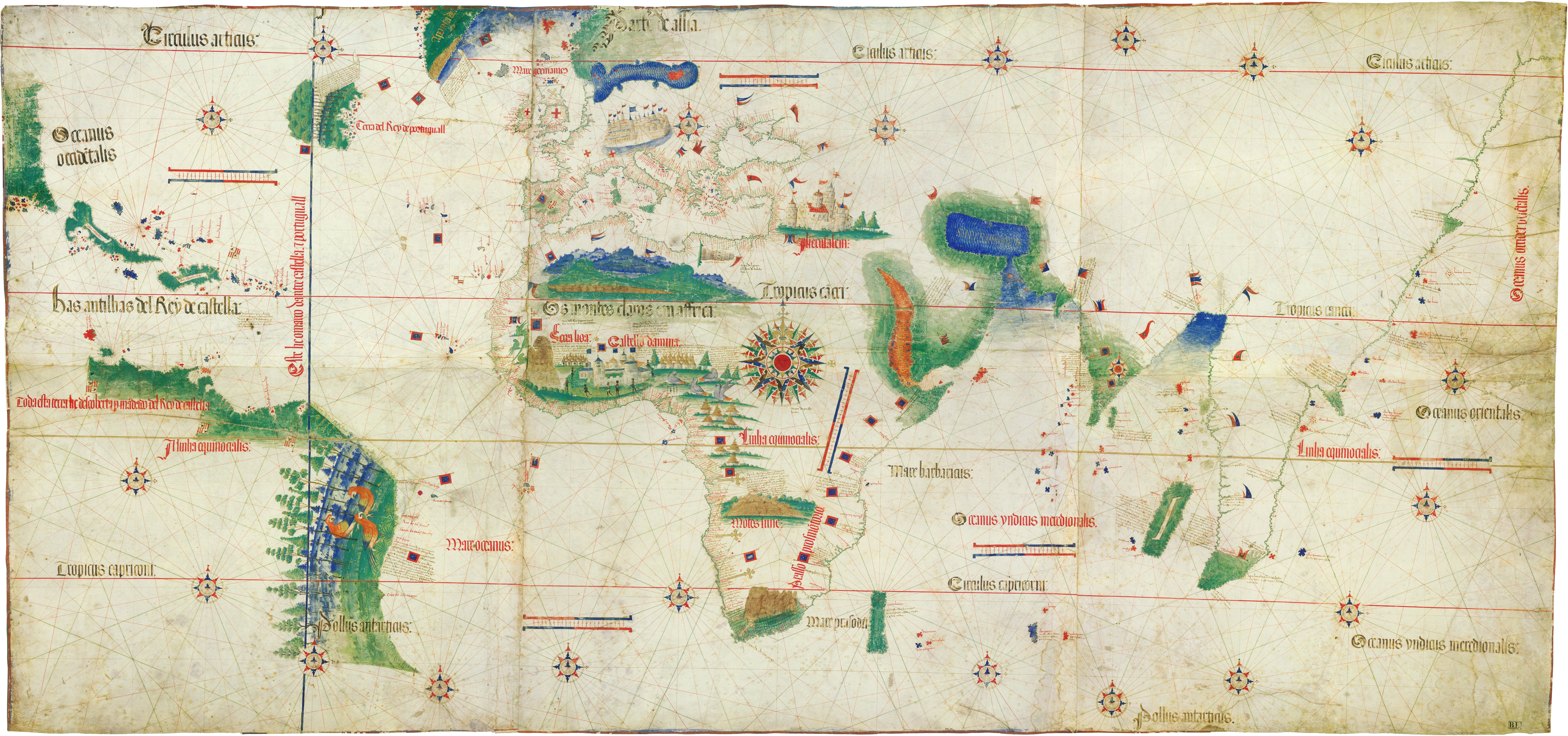
The Cantino planisphere (1502), which was the first world map to show the Americas separate from Asia

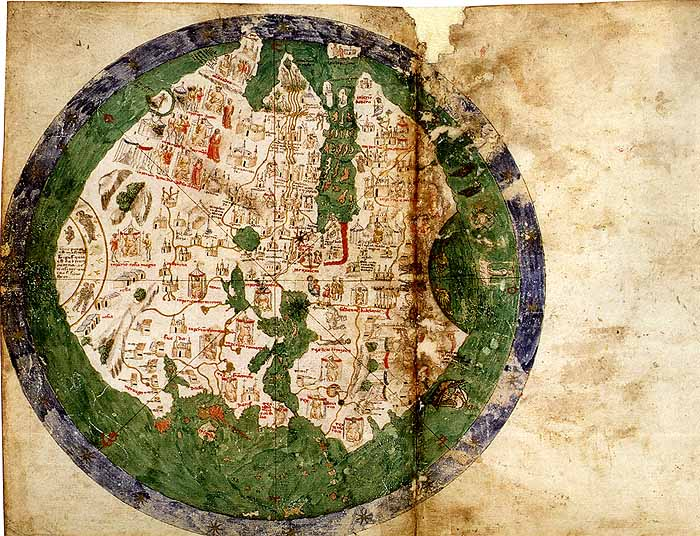
The Bianco map (1436)

Many academic reviewers of The Vinland Map and the Tartar Relation took the opportunity to point out evidence that called the map's authenticity into question. So a year later, a Vinland Map Conference was held at the Smithsonian Institution, during which further significant questions were asked, particularly of Witten. However, the proceedings were not published for another five years.

There were questions about the actual content of the map. Witten had pointed out that it bore strong resemblances to a map made in the 1430s by Italian mariner Andrea Bianco, but others found some of the similarities and differences very strange—the map cuts off Africa where Bianco's map has a page fold, but distorts shapes, and includes major revisions in the far east and west. The most surprising revision is that, unlike, for example, the famous Cantino World Map, the Vinland Map depicts Greenland as an island, remarkably close to the correct shape and orientation (while Norway, of which Greenland was just a colony, is wildly inaccurate) although contemporary Scandinavian accounts—including the work of Claudius Clavus in the 1420s—depict Greenland as a peninsula joined to northern Russia. For practical purposes, Arctic sea ice may have made this description true, and Greenland is not known to have been successfully circumnavigated until the 20th century. Skelton wondered also whether the revisions in the far east were meant to represent Japan—they seem to show not only Honshu, but also Hokkaido and Sakhalin, omitted even from Oriental maps in the 15th century.

In addition, the text uses a Latin form of Leif Ericson's name ("Erissonius") more consistent with 17th-century norms and with transmission through a French or Italian source. The Latin captions include several usages of the ligature æ; this was almost unknown in later medieval times (a simple e was written instead), and although the ligature was revived by Italian humanist scholars in the early 15th century, it is found only in documents of deliberately classicising humanist minuscule produced by Italian scribes, and never in conjunction with a Gothic style of script such as is seen in the map.

Another point calling the map's authenticity into question was raised at the 1966 Conference: that one caption referred to Bishop Eirik of Greenland "and neighboring regions" (in Latin, "regionumque finitimarum"), a title known previously from the work of religious scholar Luka Jelić (1864–1922). An essay by British researcher Peter Foote for the Saga Book of the Viking Society (vol. 11, part 1), published shortly after the conference, noted that German researcher Richard Hennig (1874–1951) had spent years, before the Vinland Map was revealed, fruitlessly trying to track Jelić's phrase down in medieval texts. It seemed that either Jelić had seen the Vinland Map and promised not to reveal its existence (keeping the promise so rigidly that he never mentioned any of the other new historical information on the map), or that he had invented the phrase as a scholarly description, and the Vinland Map creator copied him. In practice, because Jelić's work had gone through three editions, Foote was able to demonstrate how the first edition (in French) had adopted the concept from the work of earlier researchers, listed by Jelić, then the later editions had adapted the anachronistic French scholarly phrase "évêque régionnaire des contrées américaines" into Latin.

Handwriting experts at the 1966 Conference tended to disagree with Witten's assessment that the map captions had been written by the same person as the Speculum and Relation texts. This had also been a major reason why the British Museum had rejected the map in 1957, the Keeper of Manuscripts having detected elements of handwriting style not developed until the nineteenth century.

=== Analysis of ink ===
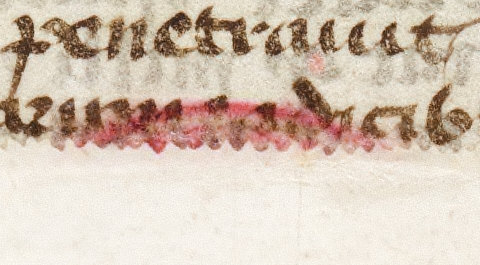
The last remnant of old ownership marks in Speculum historiale

Complaints were made at the Conference that no scientist had been permitted to examine the map and its companion documents in all the years of study since 1957. Skelton's scientific colleagues at the British Museum made a short preliminary examination in 1967 and found that:

1. despite its appearance to the naked eye, the ink was certainly not conventional iron-gall ink like its two companion manuscripts, and indeed was unlike any recipe they had ever seen (they spent several months after the initial testing trying to find similar inks as far afield as Iceland);
2. the map outline appeared to consist of two superimposed lines, one black (but mostly vanished) which looked like graphite or soot, and one yellowish;
3. the whole of the map parchment (again, unlike its companions) had been coated or soaked in an unknown substance—they were not allowed to take a large enough sample to analyze it;
4. they could not be certain that the two halves of the map, held together by a binding strip glued on the back, had ever been a single sheet—unlike any other known medieval double-page map; looking at the map, it is clear that the artist knew exactly, to the nearest millimeter, where it was going to be folded, because several place-names start or finish right next to it while none are written straight across it, and the rivers of eastern Europe run parallel to it;
5. the rebinding of the Speculum volume without the map and Relation had used plastic thread, only available since about 1950.

In 1972, with new technology becoming available, Yale sent the map for chemical analysis by forensic specialist Walter McCrone whose team, using a variety of techniques, found that the yellowish lines contain anatase (titanium dioxide) in a rounded crystalline form manufactured for use in pale pigments since the 1920s, indicating that the ink was modern. They also confirmed that the ink contained only trace amounts of iron, and that the black line remnants were on top of the yellow, indicating that they were not the remains of a penciled guide-line, as the British Museum staff had speculated.

A new investigation in the early 1980s, by a team under Thomas Cahill at the University of California, Davis, using particle-induced X-ray emission (PIXE) found that only trace amounts (< 0.0062% by weight) of titanium appeared to be present in the ink, which should have been too little for some of McCrone's analyses to detect. The Cahill team acknowledged, however, that titanium was the only element within their technique's measurement capability which was significantly more concentrated in the ink than on the bare parchment (other elements such as iron and zinc were found concentrated in some inked samples, but only a minority). One member of the team, Gregory Möller, also analyzed loose particles retrieved from the split down the middle of the map by a different method, finding that most of them were rich in titanium (though a few black particles were rich in chromium and iron). Because they were the first to apply PIXE to ink analysis, nobody at the time could explain the difference between the Cahill and McCrone figures. Attempting to reconcile the conflicting results, the Cahill team suggested that the high concentrations found by McCrone were due to a combination of contamination from modern dust, and poor sample selection (i.e. choosing contaminant particles like those in the split); however, they also chose not to publish or publicise Möller's loose particle study. The accumulation of large amounts of PIXE data from other laboratories around the world in the ensuing decades was sufficient by 2008 to show that the Cahill figures for all elements in the inks of the map and its companion documents are at least a thousand times too small, so the discrepancy is due to a problem with their work.

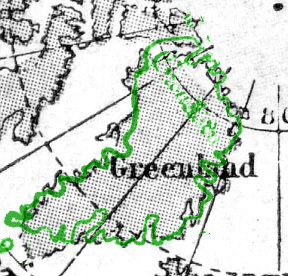
Greenland from the Vinland Map superimposed (in green) on an early-20th-century atlas map. The unstippled area at the northern tip represents land not surveyed until after 1896.

The McCrone team had also made mistakes, though none as fundamental as Cahill's. Revisiting his notes in 1987 to draft a detailed reply to the abbreviated public version of Cahill's report, Walter McCrone chose the wrong sample to illustrate a "typical" black ink particle, selecting one which had been found only loosely attached to the ink. By focusing on this contamination, rich in chromium and iron, he gave Cahill the opportunity to re-emphasise his case in an essay for an expanded version of the 1965 official book, a few years later.

In 1991, McCrone, then director and senior research microscopist with the McCrone Research Institute, visited Yale to take new microsamples from the map, partly to check his earlier results, and partly to apply new techniques. Photomicrographs taken at 1 micrometer intervals through the thickness of ink samples demonstrated that the manufactured anatase particles were not just sticking to the surface as Cahill's criticisms had implied, and Fourier transform spectroscopy identified the ink's binder as gelatin, probably made from animal skin. In July 2002, using Raman spectroscopy, the presence of significant quantities of anatase in the map ink was confirmed by British researchers Katherine Brown and Robin Clark, and the remaining traces of black pigment in the ink were found to consist essentially of soot-type carbon.

Various scientists have formed their own theories to explain how the 20th century manufactured anatase in the Vinland Map ink could have got into genuine medieval ink. The first was chemist Jacqueline Olin, then a researcher with the Smithsonian Institution, who in the 1970s conducted experiments which produced anatase at an early stage of a medieval iron-gall ink production process. Examination of her anatase by a colleague, mineralogist Kenneth Towe, showed that it was very different from the neat, rounded crystals found in the Vinland Map and modern pigments. Towe himself, a clay specialist, briefly considered the possibility that the anatase could have come from clay, where it is present in trace amounts, but on checking McCrone's data found no significant traces of clay minerals. Shortly before the Raman analysis was published, historian Douglas McNaughton based a mistaken theory about the ink around McCrone's emphasis on the chromium-rich black particle, having obtained unpublished data on the similar particles in Möller's report.

Olin published a paper that identifies the anatase in the Vinland Map ink as being truncated bi-pyramidal rather than rounded crystals (however, this is not vastly different from the McCrones' 1974 description of the crystals as "smooth, rounded rhomb shapes").

=== Dating of parchment ===
Radiocarbon dating, begun in 1995 by physicist Douglass Donahue and chemists Jacqueline Olin and Garman Harbottle, placed the origin of the parchment somewhere between 1423 and 1445. The initial results were confusing because the unknown substance the British Museum had found across the whole map, effectively ignored by later researchers who were concentrating on the ink, turned out to be trapping tiny traces of fallout deep within the parchment from 1950s nuclear tests. Although there was none of this 1950s substance on top of the ink, further tests, starting with a detailed chemical analysis, were needed to confirm whether the lines were drawn after it soaked into the parchment.

In 2008, Harbottle's attempt to explain a possible medieval origin for the ink was published, but he was shown by Towe and others to have misunderstood the significance of the various analyses, rendering his theory meaningless.

=== "VMTR 95" ===
The expanded 30th anniversary edition of the 1965 official book, The Vinland Map and the Tartar Relation, was notable for its exclusion of most of the evidence against the map's authenticity, concentrating instead on vindications by George Painter, and Thomas Cahill with colleague Bruce Kusko (in which they claimed specifically that they had not analyzed the loose particles they took from the map at the time of their PIXE research), but it did reprint an essay written in 1989 by the original book dealer Laurence Witten. He stated that, when the McCrone investigation concluded the map to be a forgery in 1974, he was asked by Yale to reveal its provenance as a matter of urgency, and to discuss the possible return of Mr Mellon's money. He replied that he had no idea where the map came from, beyond Ferrajoli (who was convicted of theft shortly after the sale, and died shortly after release from prison). On the subject of the money, he said he could not pay it all back because he had paid agreed shares of his profit to Ferrajoli and to another dealer who had introduced him. For his part, Mellon did not ask for the return of any money. The essay also revealed that Witten had, on Ferrajoli's recommendation, met with Irving Davis after buying the map volume in 1957.

Regardless of the controversy, the map, which had been valued for insurance purposes at over $750,000 in the 1960s, was claimed in 1996 to be worth $25,000,000.

=== Maps, Myths, and Men, 2004 ===
In 2004, Kirsten A. Seaver published Maps, Myths, and Men: The Story of the Vinland Map, a wide-ranging review of the arguments and evidence presented to that date. Seaver was hailed as the Vinland map's "most thorough and outspoken critic in recent years" for her "exemplary interdisciplinary study". She also theorized that the forger could have been Father Josef Fischer (1858–1944), an Austrian cartographer and Jesuit scholar. However, subsequent research into the provenance of the Vinland map documents (see below) suggests that they are unlikely to have spent any time in Fischer's possession. Robert Baier, a forensic handwriting analyst, examined the map text and correspondence of Fischer, and his opinion was that "they are not the same writer."

=== Danish investigation, 2005–2009 ===
In 2005, a team from the Royal Danish Academy of Fine Arts, led by René Larsen, studied the map and its accompanying manuscripts to make recommendations on the best ways to preserve it. Among other findings, this study confirmed that the two halves of the map were entirely separate, though they might have been joined in the past. A few months earlier, Kirsten Seaver had suggested that a forger could have found two separate blank leaves in the original "Speculum Historiale" volume, from which the first few dozen pages appeared to be missing, and joined them together with the binding strip. On the other hand, at the International Conference on the History of Cartography in July 2009, Larsen revealed that his team had continued their investigation after publishing their original report, and he told the press that "All the tests that we have done over the past five years—on the materials and other aspects—do not show any signs of forgery". The formal report of his presentation showed that his work ignored rather than contradicted earlier studies. For example, he experimented only with artificial wormholes, and did not follow up the observation made at the 1966 Conference, that live bookworms were a known tool of the fake antiquities trade. Similarly, he claimed that the anatase in the ink could have come from sand used to dry it (the hypothetical source of the sand being gneiss from the Binnenthal area of Switzerland) but his team had not examined the crystals microscopically, and Kenneth Towe responded that this was an essential test, given that crystal size and shape should distinguish commercial anatase from anatase found in sand.

Members of the Danish team later joined with others to perform microanalyses of the remaining piece from the 1995 carbon dating sample. They found a significant quantity of monostearin (glycerol monostearate) which is commonly used in the food and pharmaceutical industries, with additional aromatic compounds. It was thought that if it was not purely localised contamination from handling by somebody using something like hand lotion, it was likely to be the unidentified post-1950 chemical soaked into the parchment. Their microscopic examination confirmed that the parchment had been treated very roughly at some time, with 95% of fibres damaged.

=== A Sorry Saga 2018 ===
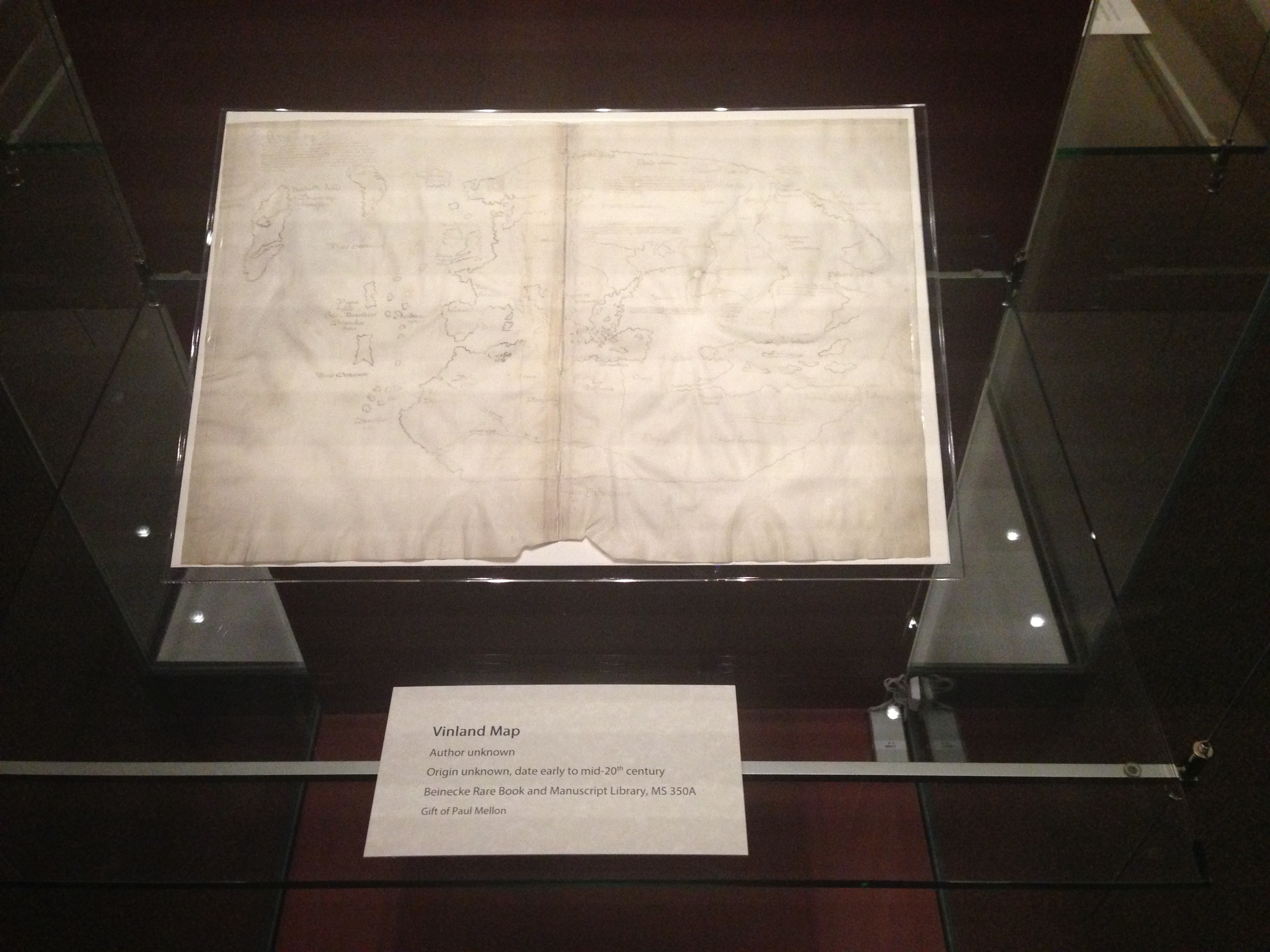
Yale's Vinland Map on display at Mystic Seaport Museum, May 2018

In June 2013, it was reported in the British press that a Scottish researcher, John Paul Floyd, claimed to have discovered two pre-1957 references to the Yale Speculum and Tartar Relation manuscripts which shed light on the provenance of the documents. According to one of these sources (an exhibition catalogue), a 15th-century manuscript volume containing books 21-24 of the Speculum Historiale and C. de Bridia's Historia Tartarorum was lent by the Archdiocese of Zaragoza for display at the 1892–93 Exposición Histórico-Europea (an event held in Madrid, Spain to commemorate the voyages of Columbus). Floyd noted that Spanish priest and scholar Cristóbal Pérez Pastor also reported having seen such a codex, in historical notes organised and published posthumously in 1926. Neither the catalogue entry nor Pérez Pastor's description mentioned the presence of a map. It is known that Enzo Ferrajoli, who offered the Vinland manuscript for sale in 1957, was convicted of having stolen manuscripts from the Cathedral Library of La Seo, Zaragoza, in the 1950s.

Separately, Floyd also observed that the creator of the Vinland Map had evidently made use of an 18th-century engraving of the 1436 Bianco map by Vincenzio Formaleoni (1752–97), since the Vinland Map reproduces several of Formaleoni's copying errors. He argued that this furnished a new and decisive proof that the map is inauthentic.

Floyd's book appeared in 2018 under the title, A Sorry Saga: Theft, Forgery, Scholarship... and the Vinland Map.

== Identification as a forgery, 2018 ==
As controversy has swirled around the map almost since its acquisition, authorities at Yale University chose not to comment on the authenticity of the parchment document. In 2002, Yale librarian Alice Prochaska commented that "We regard ourselves as the custodians of an extremely interesting and controversial document... and we watch the scholarly work on it with great interest." In 2011, Yale's Chester D. Tripp Professor of History, Paul Freedman, expressed his view that the map was "unfortunately a fake".

At the 2018 Vinland Map Symposium, Yale conservation scientist Richard Hark revealed the results of new global chemical analyses of the map and the Tartar Relation, which established that the ink lines of the map contain varying amounts of anatase "consistent with modern manufacture". So too do two small patches on the first page of the Tartar Relation, where the original iron-gall ink appears to have been erased and replaced.

Raymond Clemens, Curator of Early Books and Manuscripts at Yale's Beinecke Rare Book & Manuscript Library, considers that the latest historical and scientific research proves "beyond a doubt" that the Vinland map "was a forgery, not a medieval product as it claimed to be." In a March 2019 article, Clemens highlights the fact that "historical investigations by John Paul Floyd have revealed that the Vinland Map is based not on Bianco’s 1436 map, but on a printed facsimile map made in 1782. Floyd discovered this by noting mistakes in the 1782 map that were replicated on the Vinland map, but could be found nowhere else." Furthermore, the map has been studied at the Beinecke Library using new technology. "In the case of the Vinland map we were able to prove... [the map] was clearly a 20th century fake." Despite the map's forged origins, Clemens stated that the map would remain at the Beinecke Library, as it had "become an historical object in and of itself."

== See also ==
- Antillia
- L'Anse aux Meadows, the only confirmed Norse site in North America outside of Greenland
- Piri Reis map
- Skálholt Map
- Weimar map

== Further information ==
- Archived at Ghostarchive and the Wayback Machine: The Vinland Map: Hoaxes Within Hoaxes. Part 1, 10 October 2015
- "Scientists Determine Age of New World Map". www.bnl.gov. "Provides 2.5 Mb hi-res image of the map."
- "Iron Gall Ink". irongallink.org.
- "The Vinland Map Rediscovered: New Research on the Forgery and its Historical Context LIVESTREAM". YouTube. 21 September 2018.
- "NOVA | The Viking Deception". www.pbs.org.
- "Vinland Map - review article by Paul Saenger". www.maphistory.info.
- "Analyzing the Vinland Map : Analysis of experts opinions". www.webexhibits.org.
- Cummings, Mike (2018-02-28). "Yale putting high-tech tests to its controversial Vinland Map". YaleNews.
