= MCRI =

MCRI may refer to:

- Michigan Civil Rights Initiative
- Murdoch Children's Research Institute
- McCrone Research Institute
