= Feast of the Holy Winding Sheet of Christ =

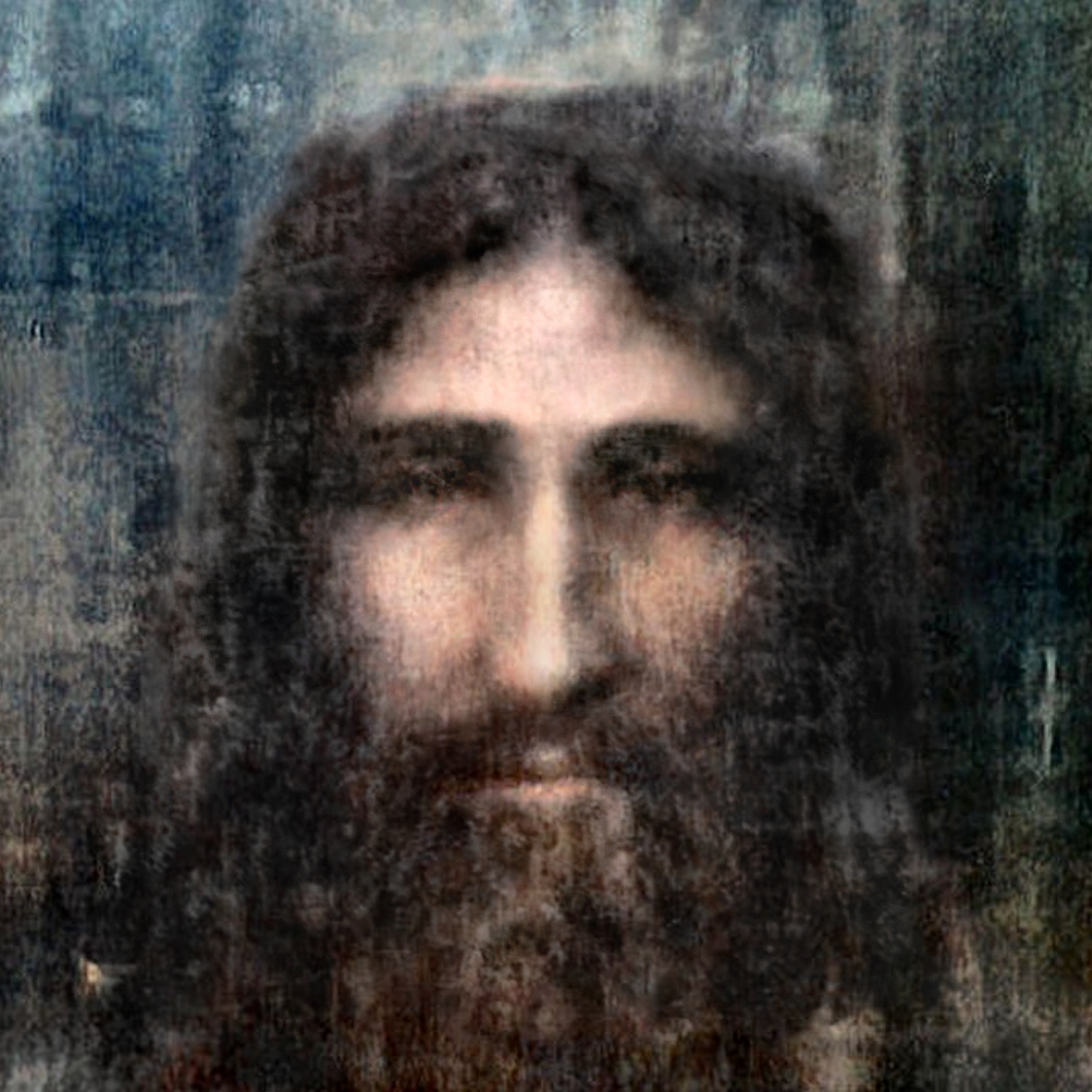
- Artist's rendition of the holy face of Jesus in the Shroud of Turin
- Official name: Feast of the Holy Cross
- Observed by: Roman Catholic Church; Old Catholic Church; Lutheran Churches; Anglican Communion
- Significance: Feast honoring the Shroud of Turin
- Date: 4 May (Gregorian calendar)
- Frequency: Annual
- Related to: Feast of the Cross, Feast of the Holy Face of Jesus Christ

In the Catholic liturgical calendar, the Feast of the Holy Winding Sheet of Christ honours the Shroud of Turin, and is observed on May 4, annually. It was officially declared by Pope Julius II in 1506.

Because details of the image are consistent with traditional depictions of Jesus Christ after his death by crucifixion, the holy shroud has been venerated for centuries, especially by members of the Catholic Church, as Jesus's actual burial shroud upon which his image was miraculously imprinted. In addition to Catholics, the Shroud of Turin is honoured by Christians of several traditions, including Lutherans and Anglicans.

== History ==
A Feast of the Holy Winding Sheet of Christ originated about 1495 at Chambéry, in Savoy, to honour the so-called sudario of Christ. It came there in 1432 from Lirey in Burgundy, and is the sheet venerated from 1578 in the royal chapel of the cathedral of Turin.

This feast was celebrated on 4 May, the day after the Invention of the Cross, and was approved in 1506 by Pope Julius II; it was kept in Savoy, Piedmont, and Sardinia as the patronal feast of the royal House of Savoy (4 May, double of the first class, with octave).

The Shroud of Turin enjoys devotion by Catholics, as well as by Lutherans and Anglicans.

== Feasts ==
=== Besançon feast ===
In 1206 another one of the supposed Winding Sheets used at the burial of Christ was brought to Besançon by Otto de la Roche, and the feast of its arrival (Susceptio) was ordered to be kept on 11 July. It became a double of the first class in the cathedral, and of the second class in the diocese.

=== Compiègne feast ===
A third feast, the Fourth Sunday in Lent (translation to a new shrine in 1092), was during the Middle Ages kept at Compiègne in France, in honour of a winding sheet brought there from Aachen in 877.

=== 1831 feast ===
The feast which from 1831 was contained in the appendix of the Breviary, on the Friday after the Second Sunday in Lent, was independent of any particular relic. Before 1831 it was rarely found on diocesan calendars. The office was taken from the Proprium of Turin.

== See also ==
- Feast of the Cross
- Feast of the Holy Face of Jesus Christ
- Maria Pierina De Micheli
