= Kirsten Seaver =

Norwegian historian and novelist (born 1934)

Kirsten A. Seaver (born 1934) is a Norwegian-American historian and novelist, known for her writing about the Norse exploration of North America. She is a Fellow of the Royal Geographical Society, and previously taught at Stanford University, in Stanford, California.

== Life and works ==
In the United States, Seaver worked for Harvard University, in Cambridge, Massachusetts,as secretary at the university library and consultant on its Scandinavian collections, from 1956 to 1960. She later taught Norwegian at Stanford, from 1975 to 1982. In 1994, she joined the Meta Incognita Project, studying Martin Frobisher's Arctic expeditions and attempt to start a colony in Canada.

Seaver is known for her 2004 book, Maps, Myths, and Men: The Story of the Vinland Map, on the history of the Vinland Map – a map whose authenticity has been debated since its first appearance in 1957 and is now considered a forgery.

She has also published novels in German and Norwegian.

== Publications ==
- The Frozen Echo: Greenland and the Exploration of North America, ca. A.D. 1000–1500 (1996). ISBN 0804731616
- In Quisling's Shadow: The Memoirs of Vidkun Quisling's First Wife, Alexandra (1999). ISBN 0817948325 (co-wrote)
- Maps, Myths, and Men: The Story of the Vinland Map (2004). ISBN 0804749639
- The Last Vikings: The Epic Story of the Great Norse Voyagers (2021). ISBN 1350143367

=== Novels ===
- Gudrids saga (1994)
- Landet som falt av jorden (1996)
- Øst i havet ligger Vesterøy (1998)
- Das Kuckucks Kind (2002)
- Mørke skyer over Solhellinga (2007)

=== Selected research ===
- Norumbega and Harmonia Mundi in Sixteenth-Century Cartography (1998)

== See also ==
- List of American novelists
- List of Harvard University people
- List of historians
- List of Stanford University faculty and staff
- List of women writers
