= Shroud of Turin =

Cloth bearing the alleged image of Jesus

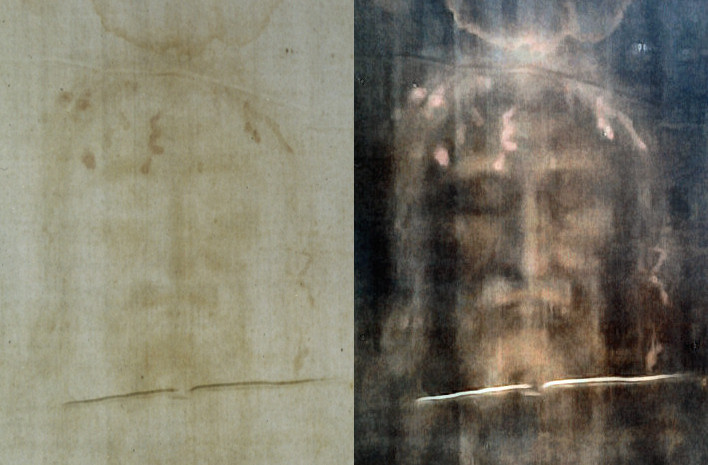
- The Shroud of Turin: modern photo of the face, positive (left), and digitally processed image (right)
- Material: Linen
- Size: 4.4 m × 1.1 m (14 ft 5 in × 3 ft 7 in)
- Present location: Chapel of the Holy Shroud, Turin, Italy
- Period: 13th to 14th century

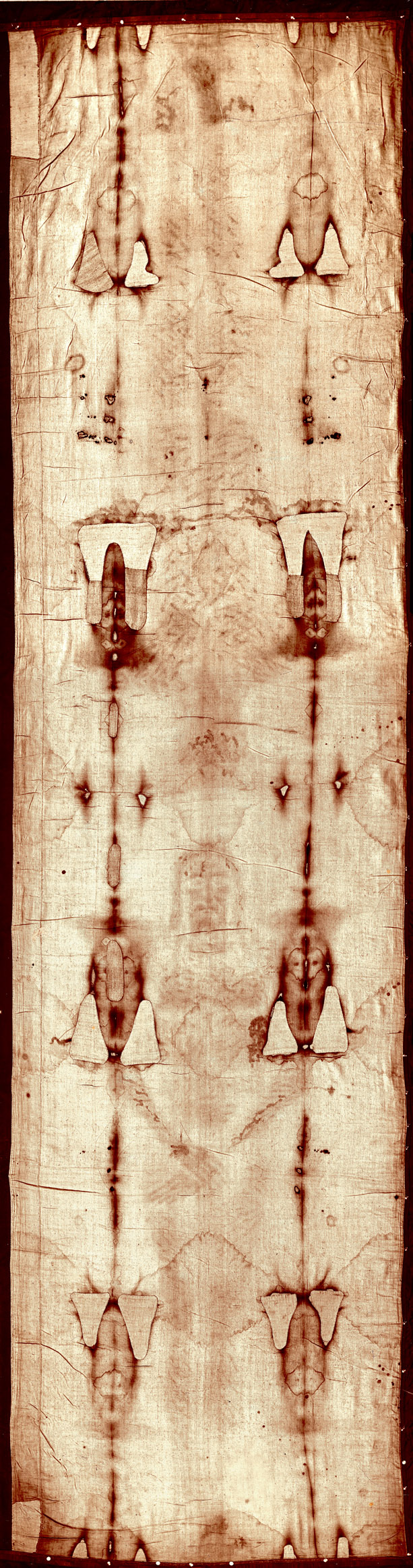
Full-length image of the Turin Shroud before the 2002 restoration

The Shroud of Turin (Italian: Sindone di Torino), also known as the Holy Shroud (Italian: Sacra Sindone), is a length of linen cloth that bears a faint image of the front and back of a naked man. Because details of the image are consistent with traditional depictions of Jesus of Nazareth after his death by crucifixion, the shroud has been venerated by Christians for centuries, especially by members of the Catholic Church, as Jesus's shroud upon which his image was miraculously imprinted. The human image on the shroud can be discerned more clearly in a black-and-white photographic negative than in its natural sepia colour, an effect discovered in 1898 by Secondo Pia, who produced the first photographs of the shroud. This negative image is associated with a popular Catholic devotion to the Holy Face of Jesus.

The documented history of the shroud dates back to 1354, when it began to be exhibited in the new collegiate church of Lirey, a village in north-central France. The shroud was denounced as a forgery by the bishop of Troyes, Pierre d'Arcis, in 1389. It was acquired by the House of Savoy in 1453 and later deposited in a chapel in Chambéry, where it was damaged by fire in 1532. In 1578, the Savoys moved the shroud to their new capital in Turin, where it has remained ever since. In 1694, it was moved to the altar in the Chapel of the Holy Shroud, which was designed for that purpose by the architect Guarino Guarini and which is connected to both the royal palace and the Turin Cathedral. It remained there until 1993, when it was moved to the cathedral. Ownership of the shroud passed from the House of Savoy to the Catholic Church after the death of the former king Umberto II of Italy in 1983.

The microscopist and forensic expert Walter McCrone found, based on his examination of samples taken in 1978 from the surface of the shroud using adhesive tape, that the image on the shroud had been painted with a dilute solution of red ochre pigment in a gelatin medium. McCrone also found that the apparent bloodstains were painted with vermilion pigment, also in a gelatin medium. McCrone's findings were disputed by other researchers, and the nature of the image on the shroud continues to be debated. In 1988, radiocarbon dating by three independent laboratories established that the shroud dates back to the Middle Ages, between 1260 and 1390.

The nature and history of the shroud have been the subjects of extensive and long-lasting controversies in both the scholarly literature and the popular press. Although the radiocarbon dating of the shroud is accepted as valid by experts, it continues to generate significant public debate. Defenders of the authenticity of the shroud have questioned the radiocarbon results, usually on the basis that the samples tested might have been contaminated or taken from a repair to the original fabric. Such fringe theories, which have been rejected by most experts, include the medieval repair theory, the bio-contamination theories and the carbon monoxide theory. Currently, the Catholic Church neither endorses nor rejects the authenticity of the shroud as a relic of Jesus.

== Description ==
The shroud is rectangular, measuring approximately 4.4 by 1.1 metres (14 ft 5 in × 3 ft 7 in). The cloth is woven in a three-to-one herringbone twill composed of flax fibrils. Its most distinctive characteristic is the faint, brownish image of a front and back view of a naked man with his hands folded across his groin. The two views are aligned along the midplane of the body and point in opposite directions. The front and back views of the head nearly meet at the middle of the cloth.

The image in faint straw-yellow colour on the crown of the cloth fibres appears to be of a man with a beard, moustache, and shoulder-length hair parted in the middle. He is muscular and tall (various experts have measured him as from 1.70 to 1.88 m or 5 ft 7 in to 6 ft 2 in). Reddish-brown stains are found on the cloth, correlating with the wounds in the Biblical description of the crucifixion of Jesus.

The shroud was damaged in a fire in 1532 in the chapel in Chambéry, France. There are some burn holes and scorched areas down both sides of the linen, caused by contact with molten silver during the fire that burned through it in places while it was folded. Fourteen large triangular patches and eight smaller ones were sewn onto the cloth by Poor Clare nuns to repair the damage.

In May 1898 the Italian photographer Secondo Pia was allowed to photograph the shroud. He took the first photograph of the shroud on 28 May 1898. In 1931, another photographer, Giuseppe Enrie, photographed the shroud and obtained results similar to Pia's. In 1978 ultraviolet photographs were taken of the shroud.

== History ==
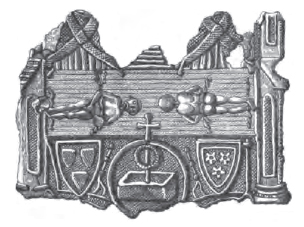
Pilgrimage badge of Lirey depicting the Shroud and dating between 1355 and 1410

There are no definite historical records concerning the particular shroud currently at Turin Cathedral prior to the 14th century. A burial cloth, which some historians maintain was the Shroud, was owned by the Byzantine emperors but disappeared during the Sack of Constantinople in 1204. Although there are numerous reports of Jesus's burial shroud, or an image of his head, of unknown origin, being venerated in various locations before the 14th century, there is no historical evidence that these refer to the shroud currently in Turin.

In 1353 the village of Lirey, in north-central France, was enriched with a small collegiate church endowed by the local feudal lord, a knight named Geoffroi de Charny. Charny died in 1356 at the Battle of Poitiers. Around 1355, the dean of the chapter of Lirey, Robert de Caillac, began exhibiting in the church a long fabric that bore an image of the mangled body of Jesus. In a treatise on unexplained phenomena (mirabilia) dated between 1355–1382, Nicole Oresme, the scholarly Bishop of Lisieux, referred to the shroud as a "patent" instance of fraudulent relics created by clergymen to enrich their churches. In 1390 the Bishop of Troyes, Pierre d'Arcis, who had jurisdiction over the church in Lirey, wrote a lengthy memorandum to Antipope Clement VII (recognized as Pope by the Church in France during the Western Schism), declaring that the Shroud was a forgery and that a previous Bishop of Troyes, Henri de Poitiers, had identified the artist who had made it. Clement issued a bull allowing the canons of Lirey to continue exhibiting the Shroud as long as they made it clear that it was an artistic representation of the passion of Jesus and not a true relic.

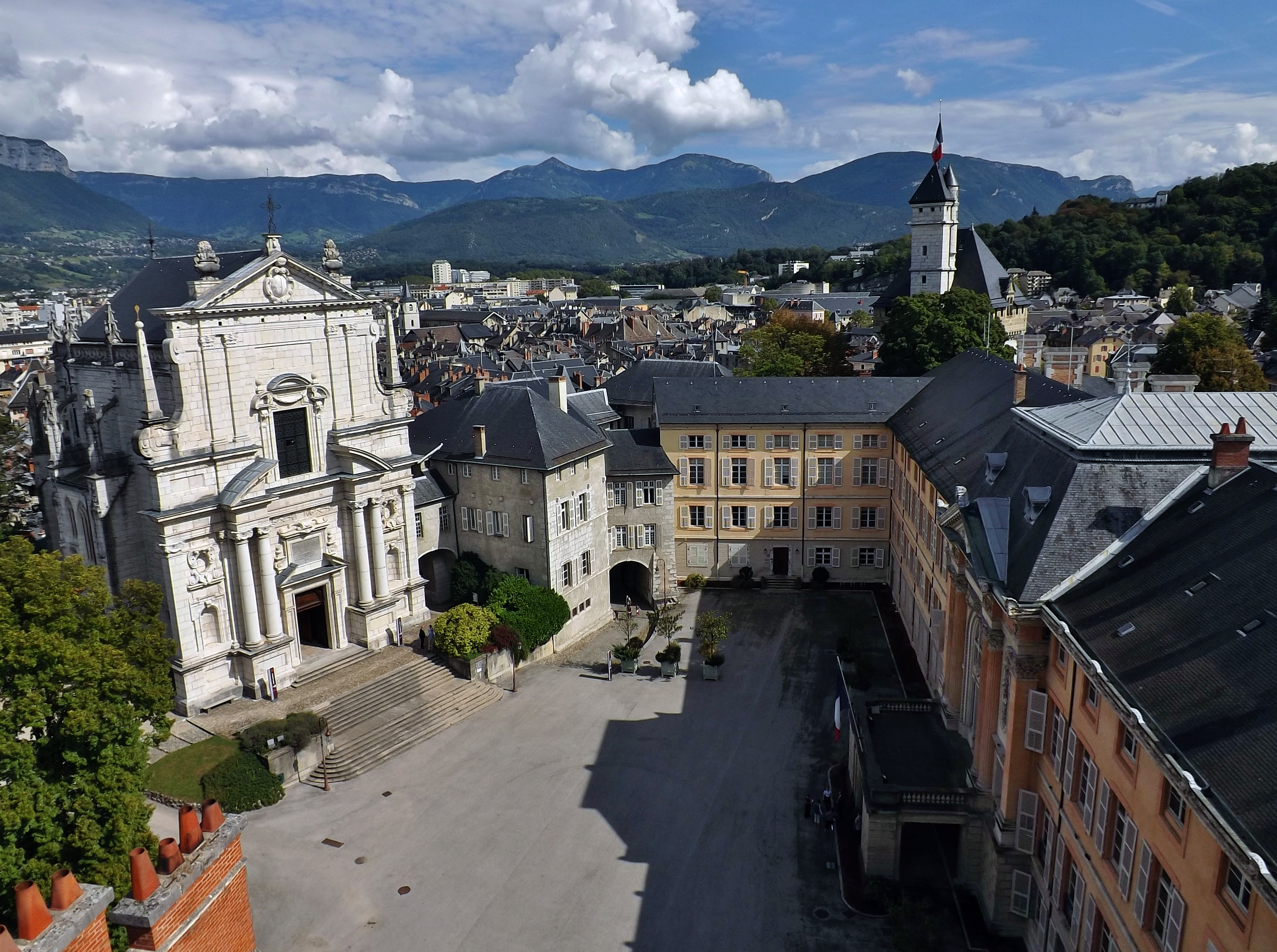
Inner courtyard of the palace of the Dukes of Savoy in Chambéry. On the left is the façade of the Sainte-Chapelle where the Shroud was kept until 1578.

In 1415, during the last phase of the Hundred Years' War, the Shroud was removed from the church of Lirey with the intention of depositing it temporarily at the castle of Montfort for safekeeping. Marguerite de Charny, the granddaughter of the knight who had endowed the church of Lirey, then took possession of the cloth and exhibited it at the church of Saint-Hippolyte, Doubs. Marguerite's refusal to return the Shroud to Lirey led to litigation. She carried the Shroud in traveling exhibitions, including to Chimay and Mons. In 1453 Marguerite deeded the Shroud to Louis, Duke of Savoy. For having sold the Shroud and disregarded the rights of the canons of Lirey, Marguerite was excommunicated by the curia of Besançon in 1457.

The Shroud became the palladium of the House of Savoy, and by 1466 it had been deposited in the ducal chapel in Chambéry, the capital of the Savoyard state. In 1506 Pope Julius II authorized the veneration of the Shroud as a true relic of Jesus. In 1532 the Shroud was damaged by a fire in the chapel of Chambéry, when molten silver from the reliquary passed through the layers of folded cloth, leaving a symmetrical pattern of holes in the unfolded Shroud but without doing much damage to the image areas. The Poor Clare nuns in Chambéry later sewed patches over those holes. In 1578 Emmanuel Philibert, Duke of Savoy ordered the cloth to be brought to Turin, the new Savoyard capital, and it has remained in Turin ever since.

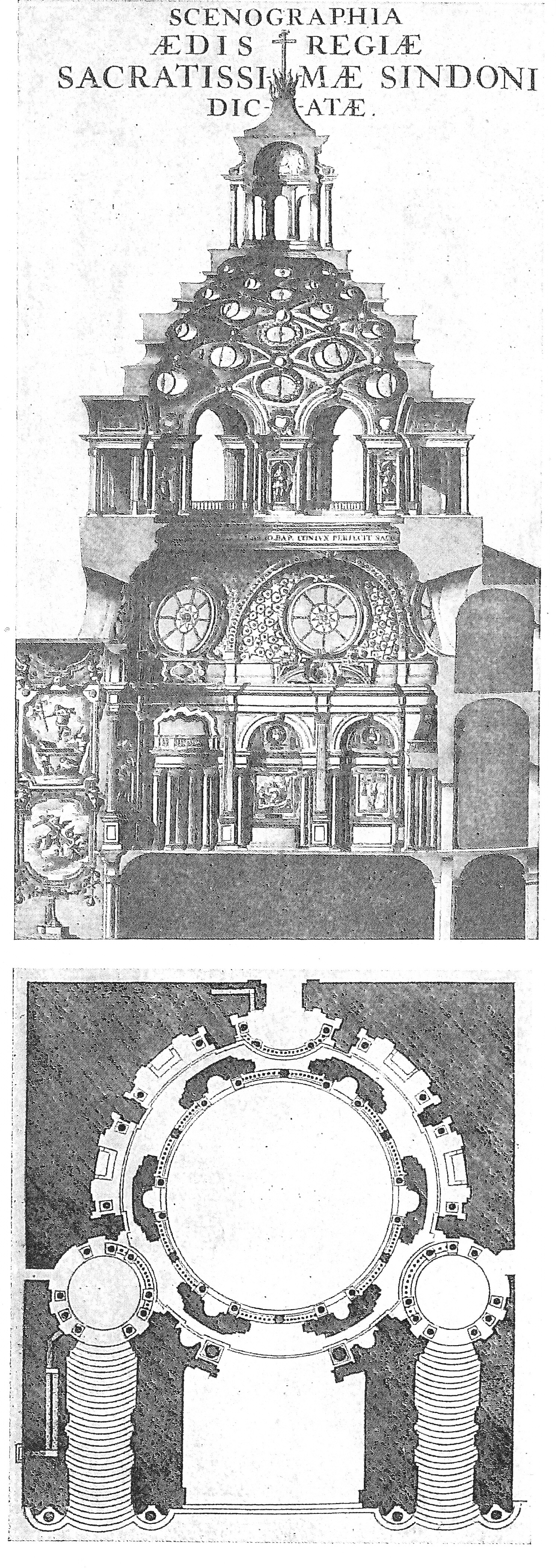
Guarino Guarini's plan for the Chapel of the Holy Shroud in Turin, 1682

In the late 17th century, the Shroud was placed in the chapel designed for that purpose by architect Guarino Guarini and attached to both the cathedral and the Royal Palace of Turin. It remained there until 1993, when it was moved into the cathedral. Repairs were made to the Shroud in 1694 by Sebastian Valfrè, improving upon the earlier patching by the Poor Clares. Further repairs were made in 1868 by Princess Maria Clotilde of Savoy. The Shroud was first photographed in 1898, during a public exhibition. The Shroud remained the property of the House of Savoy until 1983, when it was bequeathed to the Holy See according to the terms of the will of the former king Umberto II of Italy.

A fire, possibly caused by arson, threatened the Shroud on 11 April 1997. In 2002 the Holy See had the Shroud restored. The cloth backing and thirty patches were removed, making it possible to photograph and scan the reverse side of the cloth, which had been hidden from view. A faint part-image of the body was found on the back of the Shroud in 2004. The Shroud was placed back on public display (the 18th time in its history) in Turin from 10 April to 23 May 2010; and according to Church officials, more than 2 million visitors came to see it.

On Holy Saturday (30 March) 2013, images of the Shroud were streamed on various websites as well as on television for the first time in 40 years. Roberto Gottardo of the diocese of Turin stated that for the first time they had released high-definition images of the Shroud that can be used on tablet computers and can be magnified to show details not visible to the naked eye. As this rare exposition took place, Pope Francis issued a carefully worded statement which urged the faithful to contemplate the Shroud with awe but, like most of his predecessors, he "stopped firmly short of asserting its authenticity".

The Shroud was again placed on display in the cathedral in Turin from 19 April 2015 to 24 June 2015. There was no charge to view it, but an appointment was required.

== Conservation ==
The Shroud has undergone several restorations and several steps have been taken to preserve it to avoid further damage and contamination. It is kept under laminated bulletproof glass in an airtight case. The temperature- and humidity-controlled case is filled with argon (99.5%) and oxygen (0.5%) to prevent chemical changes. The shroud itself is kept on an aluminium support sliding on runners and stored flat within the case. During a 2002 restoration by the Commission for the Conservation of the Shroud, thirty triangular patches and a Holland cloth backing that had been added by nuns in 1534 were removed. This restoration has been criticized as causing damage to the Shroud.

== Religious views ==
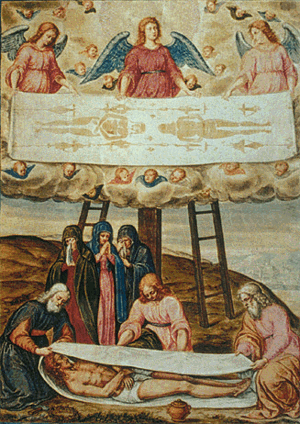
Artistic depiction of the Shroud of Turin, incorporated into a scene of the Descent from the Cross, by painter Giulio Clovio, c. 1540. Clovio shows Jesus's right hand crossed over the left, which is not consistent with the image on the Shroud.

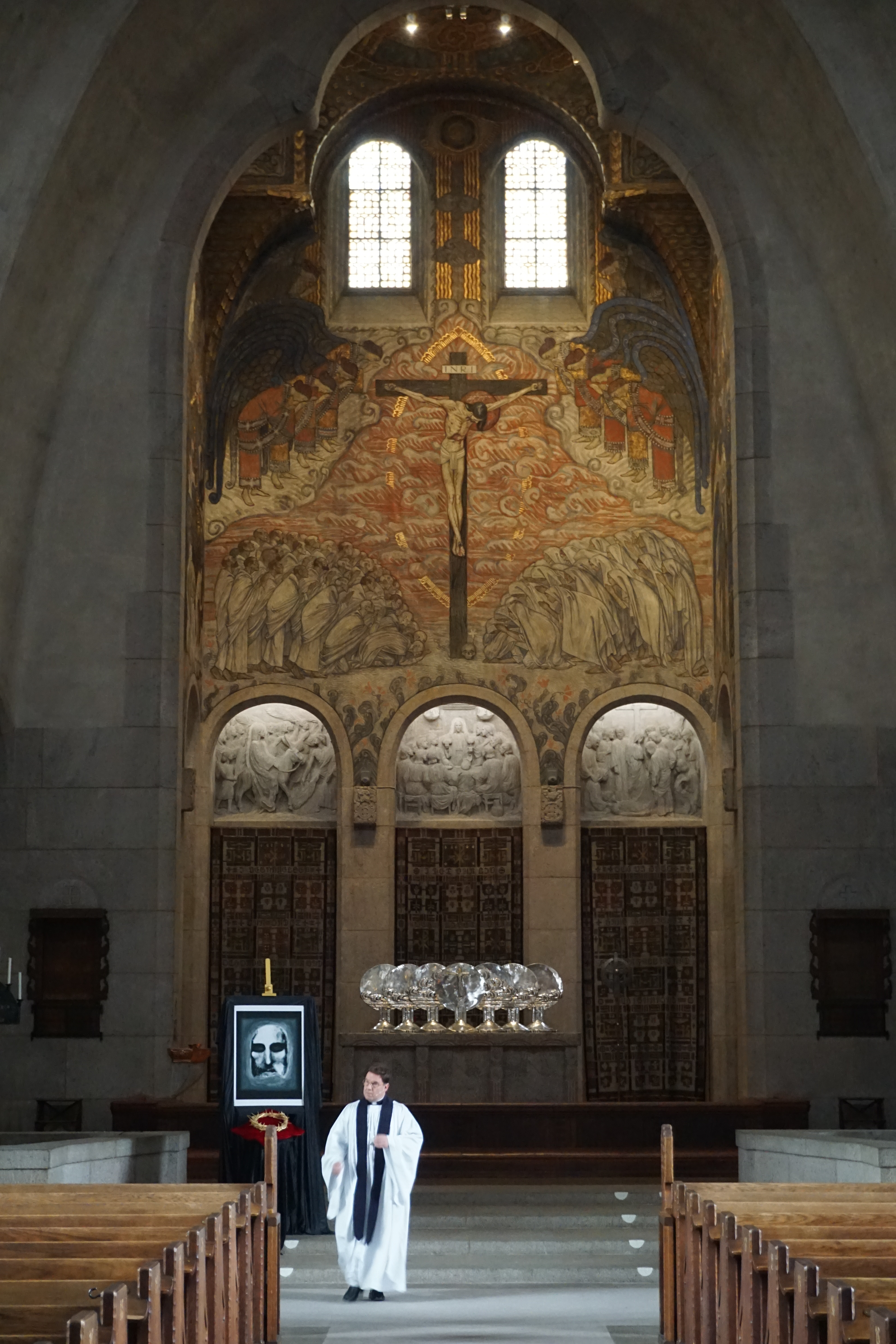
A replica of the Shroud of Turin is displayed on Good Friday at Engelbrekt Evangelical-Lutheran Church.

The Gospels of Matthew, Mark and Luke state that Joseph of Arimathea wrapped the body of Jesus in a "linen cloth" or "linen shroud" or just in "linen" (Note: Translations into English differ in the choice of words used.) (Greek: sindon) and placed it in a new tomb. The Gospel of John says that the body was wrapped in linen cloths (Greek: othonia), with a significant quantity of myrrh and aloes.

The Gospel of John states that after the Resurrection of Jesus, "Simon Peter came, following him, and went into the tomb. He saw the linen wrappings lying there, and the cloth that had been on Jesus's head, not lying with the linen wrappings but rolled up in a place by itself." The Gospel of Luke states: "But Peter got up and ran to the tomb; stooping and looking in, he saw the linen cloths by themselves; then he went home, amazed at what had happened."

In 1543, John Calvin, in his book Treatise on Relics, explained why the Shroud cannot be genuine:

In all the places where they pretend to have the graveclothes, they show a large piece of linen by which the whole body, including the head, was covered, and, accordingly, the figure exhibited is that of an entire body. But the Evangelist John relates that Christ was buried, "as is the manner of the Jews to bury". What that manner was may be learned, not only from the Jews, by whom it is still observed, but also from their books, which explain what the ancient practice was. It was this: The body was wrapped up by itself as far as the shoulders, and then the head by itself was bound round with a napkin, tied by the four corners, into a knot. And this is expressed by the Evangelist, when he says that Peter saw the linen clothes in which the body had been wrapped lying in one place, and the napkin which had been wrapped about the head lying in another. The term napkin may mean either a handkerchief employed to wipe the face, or it may mean a shawl, but never means a large piece of linen in which the whole body may be wrapped. I have, however, used the term in the sense which they improperly give to it. On the whole, either the Evangelist John must have given a false account, or every one of them must be convicted of falsehood, thus making it manifest that they have too impudently imposed on the unlearned.

Although pieces said to be of burial cloths of Jesus are held by at least four churches in France and three in Italy, none has gathered as much religious following as the Shroud of Turin. The religious beliefs and practices associated with the shroud predate historical and scientific discussions and have continued in the 21st century, although the Catholic Church has never passed judgment on its authenticity. An example is the Holy Face Medal bearing the image from the shroud, worn by some Catholics. Indeed, the Shroud of Turin is respected by Christians of several traditions, including Baptists, Catholics, Lutherans, Methodists, Greek Orthodox, Pentecostals and Presbyterians. Several Lutheran parishes have hosted replicas of the Shroud, for didactic and devotional purposes.

=== Miraculous images ===
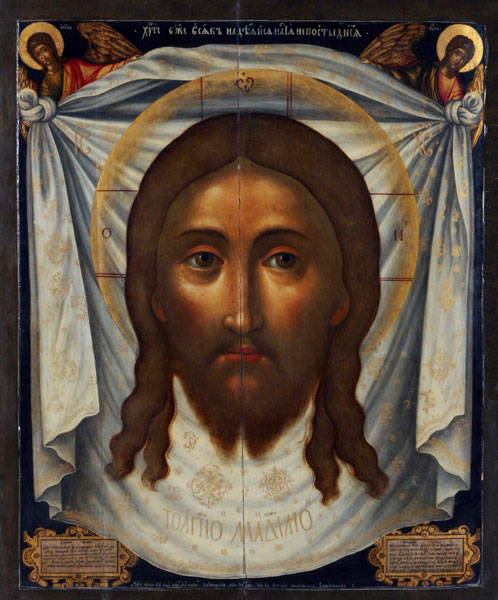
17th-century Russian icon of the Mandylion by Simon Ushakov

The concept of acheiropoieta (Medieval Greek: αχειροποίητα, lit. 'made without hand'; sing. acheiropoieton) has a long history in Christianity, going back at least to the 6th century. These are images believed to have been miraculously produced, without the agency of any human artist. Among the most prominent acheiropoieta are the Image of Camuliana and the Image of Edessa (also called the "Mandylion"). Both of these were icons of Jesus reported to have existed in the Byzantine Empire, but which are now generally regarded as having been lost or destroyed. Other popular Byzantine acheiropoieta were Hodegetria images of the Virgin Mary.

Some images currently held in Italy and other Western European countries, including the Manoppello Image, have been revered as acheiropoieta of Jesus. These are usually associated with the tradition of the Veil of Veronica, according to which the image of Jesus's face was miraculously imprinted on the cloth that Saint Veronica used to wipe the blood and sweat from the face of Jesus when she comforted him on the Via Dolorosa. Although some of these images were once objects of major popular devotions among Catholics, today they have been overshadowed by the fame and prestige of the Shroud of Turin. Another popular relic of Jesus is the Sudarium of Oviedo, which is kept in the Cámara Santa of the Cathedral of San Salvador, in Oviedo, Spain. This is not an acheiropoieton, but rather a simple bloodstained cloth purported to have been wrapped around the head of Jesus after his death.

=== Devotions ===
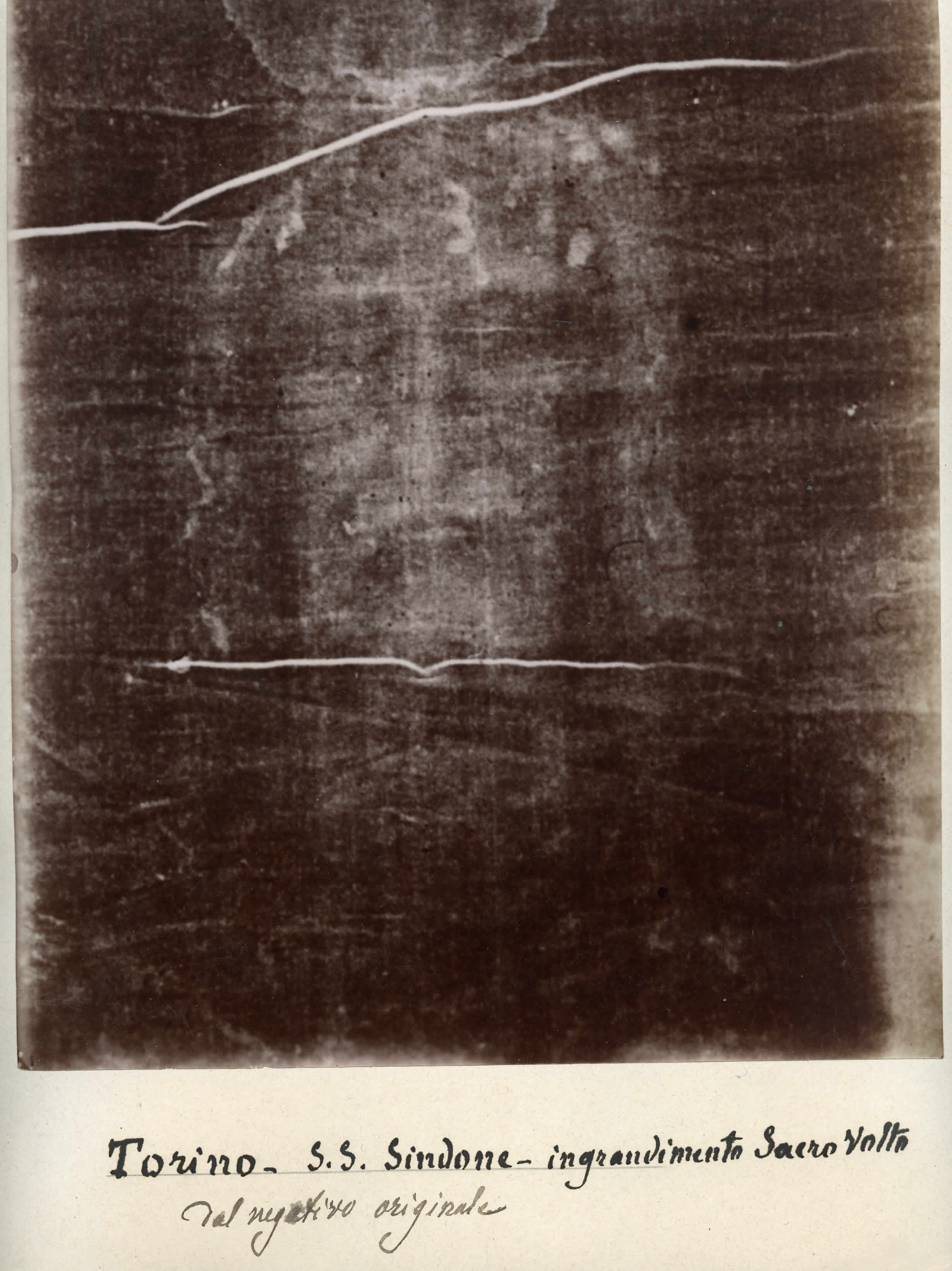
Secondo Pia's 1898 negative of the image on the Shroud of Turin, which has since been used as part of the devotion to the Holy Face of Jesus. Image from Musée de l'Élysée, Lausanne.

Today the Catholic devotions to the Holy Face of Jesus are usually associated with the negative image of the Shroud of Turin, as first captured in Secondo Pia's 1898 photograph. However, these devotions predate Pia's image, having been established in 1844 by the Carmelite nun Marie of St Peter, based on depictions of Jesus before his crucifixion and associated with the tradition of the Veil of Veronica. This devotion was then promoted by a French Catholic layman, Leo Dupont, who became known as the "Apostle of the Holy Face". In 1851 Dupont formed the "Archconfraternity of the Holy Face" in the city of Tours. Pope Leo XIII approved the devotion to the Holy Face in 1885. The popular French Saint Thérèse of Lisieux took the name "Thérèse of the Child Jesus and the Holy Face" when she became a Discalced Carmelite in 1889. Saint Thérèse, who died in 1897, also helped to spread the devotion to the Holy Face before it became associated with Pia's photographic image of the Shroud of Turin.

The modern devotion to the Holy Face centered on the negative photographic image from the Shroud of Turin derives principally from an Italian nun born in Milan, Maria Pierina De Micheli, who reported having visions of Jesus starting in 1936. Sister Maria Pierina designed a "Holy Face Medal", based on Secondo Pia's photographs. This medal was eventually approved for private devotion by Pope Pius XII.

=== Papal positions ===
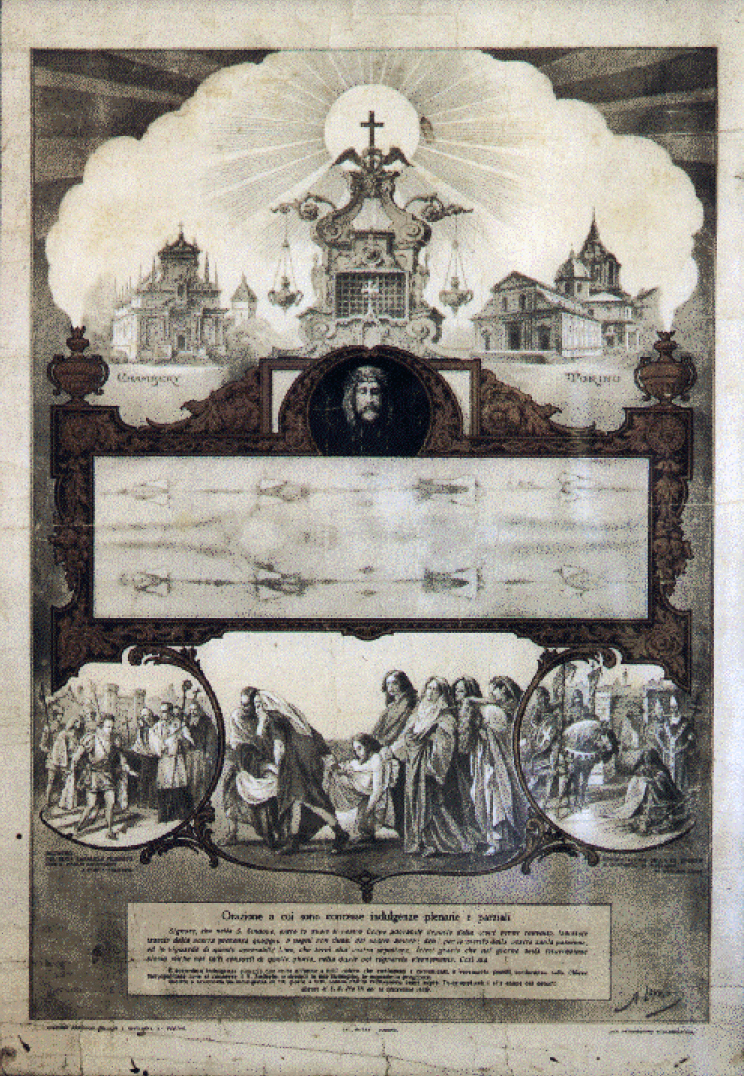
A poster advertising the 1898 exhibition of the Shroud in Turin. Secondo Pia's photograph was taken a few weeks too late to be included in the poster. The image on the poster includes a painted face, not obtained from Pia's photograph.

In 1389 the Bishop of Troyes sent a memorial to Antipope Clement VII, declaring that the cloth had been "artificially painted in an ingenious way" and that "it was also proved by the artist who had painted it that it was made by human work, not miraculously produced". In 1390 Clement VII consequently issued four papal bulls, with which he allowed the exposition, but ordered to "say aloud, to put an end to all fraud, that the aforementioned representation is not the true Shroud of Our Lord Jesus Christ, but a painting or panel made to represent or imitate the Shroud". However, in 1506 Pope Julius II reversed this position and permitted the faithful who believe the Shroud to be authentic to venerate it as such, authorizing the public veneration of it with its own mass and office.

The Vatican newspaper L'Osservatore Romano covered the story of Secondo Pia's photograph of 28 May 1898 in its edition of 15 June 1898, but it did so with no comment and thereafter Church officials generally refrained from officially commenting on the photograph for almost half a century.

The first official modern association between the Shroud and the official Catholic Church dates from 1940, when Sister Maria Pierina De Micheli approached the curia of Milan requesting authorization to produce a devotional medal based on the image of Jesus's face from the Shroud. This "Holy Face Medal" was approved by Pope Pius XII and it was initially used as a means of protection during the Second World War. In 1958 Pius XII approved of the image in association with the devotion to the Holy Face of Jesus, and decreed that the "Feast of the Holy Winding Sheet of Christ" be celebrated every year on Shrove Tuesday.

In 1936 Pius XII had referred to the Shroud as a "holy thing perhaps like nothing else". In 1998 Pope John Paul II called the Shroud a "distinguished relic" and "a mirror of the Gospel". His successor, Pope Benedict XVI, called it an "icon written with the blood of a whipped man, crowned with thorns, crucified and pierced on his right side". In 2013 Pope Francis referred to it as an "icon of a man scourged and crucified". In 1983, archbishops of the Catholic Church and Greek Orthodox Church, as well as clergy of several Protestant churches attended a prayer service at the Shroud exhibit in Turin, where they "offered their corporate blessing" to the exhibit.

In 1983 the Shroud was given to the Holy See by the House of Savoy. However, as with all relics of this kind, the Roman Catholic Church made no pronouncements on its authenticity. As with other approved Catholic devotions, the matter has been left to the personal decision of the faithful, as long as the Church does not issue a future notification to the contrary. In the Church's view, whether the cloth is authentic or not has no bearing whatsoever on the validity of what Jesus taught or on the saving power of his death and resurrection.

Pope John Paul II stated in 1998 that: "Since it is not a matter of faith, the Church has no specific competence to pronounce on these questions. She entrusts to scientists the task of continuing to investigate, so that satisfactory answers may be found to the questions connected with this Sheet." John Paul II showed himself to be deeply moved by the image of the Shroud and arranged for public showings in 1998 and 2000. In his address at Turin Cathedral on Sunday 24 May 1998 (the occasion of the 100th year of Secondo Pia's 28 May 1898 photograph), he said: "The Shroud is an image of God's love as well as of human sin... The imprint left by the tortured body of the Crucified One, which attests to the tremendous human capacity for causing pain and death to one's fellow man, stands as an icon of the suffering of the innocent in every age."

On 30 March 2013, as part of the Easter celebrations, there was an exposition of the shroud in the Cathedral of Turin. Pope Francis recorded a video message for the occasion, in which he described the image on the shroud as "this Icon of a man", and stated that "the Man of the Shroud invites us to contemplate Jesus of Nazareth". In his carefully worded statement, Francis urged the faithful to contemplate the Shroud with awe, but "stopped firmly short of asserting its authenticity".

Pope Francis went on a pilgrimage to Turin on 21 June 2015, to pray before and venerate the Holy Shroud and honour St. John Bosco on the bicentenary of his birth.

== Scientific analysis ==
Sindonology (from the Greek σινδών—sindon, the word used in the Gospel of Mark to describe the type of the burial cloth of Jesus) is the formal study of the Shroud. The Oxford English Dictionary cites the first use of this word in 1964: "The investigation ... assumed the stature of a separate discipline and was given a name, sindonology", but also identifies the use of "sindonological" in 1950 and "sindonologist" in 1953.

Secondo Pia's 1898 photographs of the shroud allowed the scientific community to begin to study it. A variety of scientific theories regarding the shroud have since been proposed, based on disciplines ranging from chemistry to biology and medical forensics to optical image analysis. The scientific approaches to the study of the Shroud fall into three groups: material analysis (both chemical and historical), biology and medical forensics and image analysis.

=== Early studies ===
The first direct examination of the shroud by a scientific team was undertaken in 1969–1973 in order to advise on preservation of the shroud and determine specific testing methods. This led to the appointment of an 11-member Turin Commission to advise on the preservation of the relic and on specific testing. Five of the commission members were scientists, and preliminary studies of samples of the fabric were conducted in 1973.

In 1976 the physicist John P. Jackson, the thermodynamicist Eric Jumper and the photographer William Mottern used image analysis technologies developed in aerospace science for analyzing the images of the Shroud. In 1977 these three scientists and over thirty other experts in various fields formed the Shroud of Turin Research Project. In 1978 this group, often called STURP, was given direct access to the Shroud. Joe Nickell of the Committee for Skeptical Inquiry has pointed out that "STURP's leaders served on the executive council of the Holy Shroud Guild, which is devoted to the "cause" of the reputed relic", a group whose motivation it was to campaign for the legitimacy of the Turin shroud. Paleontologist Steven Schafersman has described STURP as "an organization totally composed of believers in the authenticity of the Shroud", with the exception of a single agnostic being Walter McCrone.

Also in 1978, independently from the STURP research, Giovanni Tamburelli obtained at CSELT a 3D-elaboration from the Shroud with higher resolution than Jumper and Mottern. A second result of Tamburelli was the electronic removal from the image of the blood that apparently covers the face.

==== Tests for pigments ====
In October 1978 a team of scientists affiliated with STURP took 32 samples from the surface of the Shroud, using adhesive tape. Of those samples, 18 were taken from areas of the Shroud that showed a body or blood image, while 14 were taken from non-image areas. The chemical microscopist Walter McCrone, a leading expert in the forensic authentication of historical documents and works of art, examined the tapes using polarized light microscopy and other physical and chemical techniques. McCrone concluded that the Shroud's body image had been painted with a dilute pigment of red ochre (a form of iron oxide) in a collagen tempera (i.e., gelatin) medium, using a technique similar to the grisaille employed in the 14th century by Simone Martini and other European artists. McCrone also found that the "bloodstains" in the image had been highlighted with vermilion (a bright red pigment made from mercury sulfide), also in a collagen tempera medium. McCrone reported that no actual blood was present in the samples taken from the Shroud.

Other members of STURP rejected McCrone's conclusions and concluded, based on their own examination of the Shroud and the tape samples, that the image on the Shroud could not be explained by the presence of pigments. Mark Anderson, who was working for McCrone, analyzed the Shroud samples. In his book, chemist Raymond Rogers states that Anderson, who was McCrone's Raman microscopy expert, concluded that the samples acted as organic material when he subjected them to the laser. McCrone resigned from STURP in June 1980, after giving back all of the tape samples in his possession to Ray Rogers.

John Heller and Alan Adler examined the same samples and agreed with McCrone's result that the cloth contains iron oxide. However, they argued that the exceptional purity of the chemical and comparisons with other ancient textiles showed that, while retting flax absorbs iron selectively, the iron itself was not the source of the image on the shroud.

After his analysis of the Shroud was first published in 1980, McCrone continued to argue in journal articles, public lectures, and in the book Judgment Day for the Shroud of Turin (which appeared in 1996), that the Shroud had been painted in the 14th century and that it showed no traces of actual blood. He also argued that the members of STURP lacked relevant expertise in the chemical microanalysis of historical artworks and that their non-detection of pigment in the Shroud's image was "consistent with the sensitivity of the instruments and techniques they used". For his work on the Shroud, McCrone was awarded the American Chemical Society's National Award in Analytical Chemistry in 2000.

=== Radiocarbon dating ===
Radiocarbon dating has established that the shroud is medieval, and not from the time of Jesus.

Independent radiocarbon dating tests were carried out in 1988 at the University of Oxford, the University of Arizona and the Swiss Federal Institute of Technology, following years of discussion to obtain permission from the Holy See. The tests were done on portions of a swatch taken from a corner of the shroud, and concluded with 95% confidence that the material dated to AD 1260–1390. The dating matches the first appearance of the shroud in church history. This dating is also slightly more recent than that estimated by the art historian W. S. A. Dale, who postulated on artistic grounds that the shroud is an 11th-century icon made for use in worship services.

Some proponents for the authenticity of the shroud have attempted to discount the radiocarbon dating result by claiming that the sample may represent a medieval "invisible mending" repair fragment rather than the image-bearing cloth. However, all of the hypotheses used to challenge the radiocarbon dating have been scientifically refuted, including the medieval repair hypothesis, the bio-contamination hypothesis and the carbon monoxide hypothesis.

In recent years, the radiocarbon dating data have been repeatedly statistically analysed in attempts to draw some conclusions about the reliability of the radiocarbon dating from studying the data rather than studying the shroud itself. The studies have all concluded that the data lack homogeneity, which might be due to unidentified abnormalities in the fabric tested, or to differences in the pre-testing cleaning processes used by the different laboratories. The most recent analysis (2020) found that adjusting the results from two of the labs by just ten years would be sufficient to resolve the inhomogeneity and a slightly larger adjustment of 88 years would make all of the results agree with one another statistically.

=== Biological forensics ===
==== Blood stains ====
There are several reddish stains on the shroud suggesting blood. McCrone (see painting hypothesis) showed that these contain iron oxide, and theorized that its presence was likely due to simple pigment materials used in medieval times.

While the forensic doctor Pierluigi Baima Bollone initially claimed in 1983 to have identified type AB human blood along with traces of serum, aloes, and myrrh, this conclusion was later challenged by researchers like Alan Adler and more recently Kelly Kearse, who noted that early testing methods could not definitively confirm ancient human blood due to degradation and potential contamination.

Skeptics cite forensic blood tests whose results dispute the authenticity of the Shroud, and point to the possibility that the blood could belong to a person who handled the shroud, and that the apparent blood flows on the shroud are unrealistically neat.

As of 2025, it has not been scientifically demonstrated that the blood is of human, or even primate, origin.

==== Flowers and pollen ====
A study published in 2011 by Salvatore Lorusso of the University of Bologna and others subjected two photographs of the shroud to detailed modern digital image processing, one of them being a reproduction of the photographic negative taken by Giuseppe Enrie in 1931. They did not find any images of flowers or coins or anything else on either image.

In 2015 the Italian researchers Barcaccia et al. published a new study in Scientific Reports. They examined the human and non-human DNA found when the shroud and its backing cloth were vacuumed in 1977 and 1988. They found traces of 19 different plant taxa, including plants native to Mediterranean countries, Central Europe, North Africa, the Middle East, Eastern Asia (China) and the Americas. Of the human mtDNA, sequences were found belonging to haplogroups that are typical of various ethnicities and geographic regions, including Europe, North and East Africa, the Middle East and India. A few non-plant and non-human sequences were also detected, including various birds and one ascribable to a marine worm common in the Northern Pacific Ocean, next to Canada. After sequencing some DNA of pollen and dust found on the shroud, they confirmed that many people from many different places came in contact with the shroud. According to the scientists, "such diversity does not exclude a Medieval origin in Europe but it would be also compatible with the historic path followed by the Turin Shroud during its presumed journey from the Near East." A recent DNA analysis reported in media outlets, based on a preprint study from the University of Padova, identified a proportion of genetic material, DNA traces, found on the Shroud of Turin, suggest the extensive exposure of the cloth in the Mediterranean region and the possibility that the yarn was produced in India. The researchers stated that this may reflect historical trade connections, such as the import of linen or material from regions near the Indus Valley, rather than indicating a geographic origin of the cloth. The study also noted that the detected DNA reflects material accumulated over periods of handling and environmental exposure, and does not establish the age or history of the shroud.

In 2016, Italian palynologist Marzia Boi proposed based on published pictures of pollen from the shroud that the most abundant pollen on the shroud was from genus Helichrysum and suggested that the former could have come from balms and ointments used in first century AD burial rituals. However, the researchers who studied the pollen directly had identified it as from Gundelia tournefortii.

=== Anatomical forensics ===
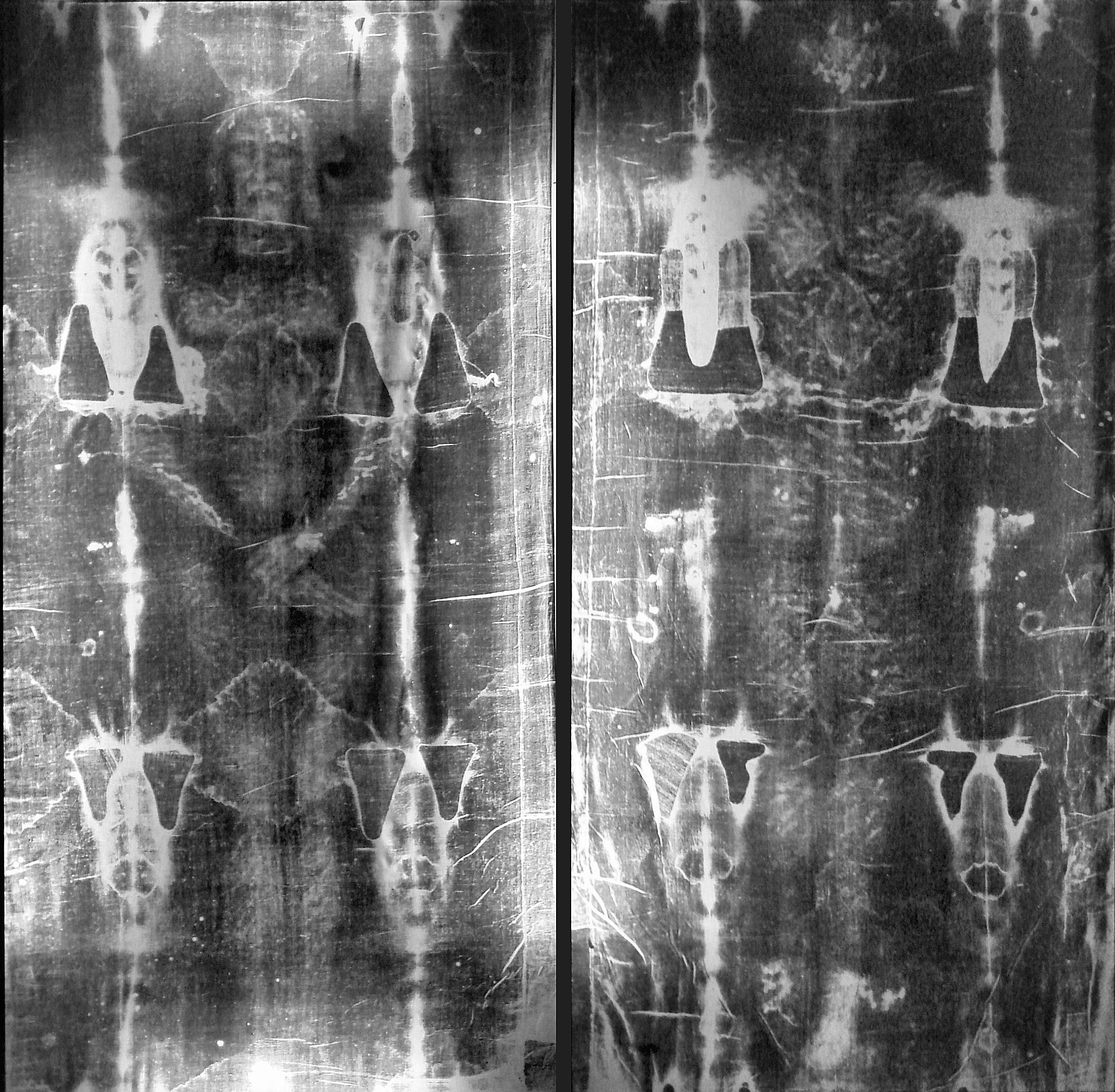
Full length negatives of the shroud

A number of studies on the anatomical consistency of the image on the shroud and the nature of the wounds on it have been performed, following the initial study by Yves Delage in 1902. Delage declared the image anatomically flawless.

The analysis of a crucified Roman, discovered near Venice in 2007, shows heel wounds that are consistent with those found on Jehohanan but which are not consistent with wounds depicted on the shroud. Also, neither of the crucifixion victims known to archaeology show evidence of wrist wounds.

Joe Nickell in 1983 and Gregory S. Paul in 2010 separately state that the proportions of the image are not realistic, noting that the forehead on the shroud is too small and that the arms are too long and of different lengths. Nickell observed that the face and proportions of the shroud image are impossible, that the figure cannot represent that of an actual person and that the posture was inconsistent. Paul also noted the size of the forehead and distance from the eyebrows to the top of the head is abnormally low, making a cranial volume well below a human without severe pathological deformity (he compared it to that of a hominid from Late Pliocene to Early Pleistocene), which would necessarily cause a comparable intellectual disability. They concluded that the features can be explained if the shroud is a work of a Gothic artist following the standard conventions of his time.

As Gregory S. Paul and Raymond E. Brown noticed, a corpse in the relaxed position portrayed on the shroud could not be positioned such that its hands cover its genitals as portrayed. The right arm and fingers of the right hand in the image appear to have been elongated to make this possible. These anatomical anomalies and inconsistent proportions were suggested to be deliberate artistic interventions to preserve the modesty of the man depicted.

Félix Ares noted a long list of anatomical anomalies in 2006. He found the arms asymmetrical, the fingers too long, the shoulders too small and the posture impossible. The feet are inconsistently depicted, with the front image showing them upwards while the back image shows the right sole resting against the cloth, which could not happen with the leg outstretched as depicted. Facial features are misplaced, and the hair is depicted at the same height and with the same force as the face, whereas on a horizontal body the hair should have rested on the ground at a much lower height. The body does not show either the natural curve of the back, nor pressure on prominent muscles from resting on a surface; Ares also theorized the empty space between the heads of both images should not exist, but show the top of the head. Furthermore, by measuring it three-dimensionally, he calculated the head to be impossibly small, beyond any known case of microcephaly. Ares believed the image resembled the most a Gothic artistic representation, noting that "if we were to transfer this set of anomalies and deformities to a living being, we would obtain a grotesque scarecrow".

In 2011, Antonio Lombatti noted several of these visual impossibilities in the body, such as the right footprint wrongly depicted in the shroud, and the locks of hair printed at the same height as the face, as if they were a solid structure, instead of resting on the ground. Lombatti further commented that the pressure from the body lying on the sheet should have caused the back image to be darker than the front image, which does not happen in the depiction of the shroud. The way the blood flows in rivulets from the head without mixing with the hair also struck him as more artistic than realistic.

In 2018 an experimental Bloodstain Pattern Analysis (BPA) was performed to study the behaviour of blood flows from the wounds of a crucified person, and to compare this to the evidence on the Turin Shroud. The comparison between different tests demonstrated that the blood patterns on the forearms and on the back of the hand are not connected, and would have had to occur at different times, as a result of a very specific sequence of movements. In addition, the rivulets on the front of the image are not consistent with the lines on the lumbar area, even supposing there might have been different episodes of bleeding at different times. These inconsistencies suggest that the Turin linen was an artistic or didactic representation, rather than an authentic burial shroud. Live Science reported that lead author of the study Matteo Borrini from Liverpool John Moores University stated: "these cannot be real bloodstains from a person who was crucified and then put into a grave, but actually handmade by the artist that created the shroud."

In 2025 a study was published in the journal Archaeometry, by Brazilian digital graphics expert and 3D designer Cicero Moraes. Moraes used software to model how clothing would move on a three-dimensional human body compared to a low-relief sculpture. In Moraes’s experiments, the image produced when a cloth is draped over a 3D human model appears misshapen and distorted. This is called the Agamemnon Mask effect, named after the Mycenaean gold funerary mask. Moraes also found that the imprint made from a low-relief sculpture closely matched the image on the Turin shroud. This supports his conclusion that the image on the shroud was an artistic creation, which Moraes interpreted as being a funerary object and a "masterwork of Christian art."

=== Image and text analysis ===
==== Image analysis ====
Both art-historical digital image processing and analog techniques have been applied to the shroud images.

In 1976 scientists used imaging equipment from the American National Aeronautics and Space Administration (NASA) to analyze a photograph of the Shroud image and decoded the shroud image into a three-dimensional image. The optical physicist and former STURP member John Dee German has noted that it is not difficult to make a photograph which has 3D qualities. If the object being photographed is lit from the front, and a non-reflective "fog" of some sort exists between the camera and the object, then less light will reach and reflect back from the portions of the object that are farther from the lens, thus creating a contrast which is dependent on distance.

The front image on the shroud is 1.95 metres (6 ft 5 in) long, and is not exactly the same size as the rear image, which is 2.02 metres (6 ft 8 in) long. Analysis of the images found them to be compatible with the shroud having been used to wrap a body 1.75 metres (5 ft 9 in) long.

The image could be compared to oshiguma, the making of face-prints as an artform, in Japan. Furthermore, the subject's physical appearance corresponds to Byzantine iconography.

The Shroud cloth is composed of threads of a nominal diameter of 0.15 mm, woven with fibers of linen with a diameter of about 10-20 μm.

The Shroud image is a faint and superficial image caused by a translucent and discontinuous yellow discoloration of the fibers. In the points where the image is present, the discoloration affects only two or three fibers on the topmost part of the threads of the cloth. In each fiber, the yellow discoloration penetrates only for 200 nm in the external cell layer.

A fiber is not necessarily colored for all its length, but, in the parts where it is, it has the property of being colored all around its cylindrical surface.

Under the crossing threads of the weave, the image is not present.

The discoloration seems caused by a kind of dehydrative oxidation process, which has discolored and chemically altered the surfaces of certain surface fibrils.

The image of the Shroud is an areal density image, in the sense that the levels of darkness are not given by variations of the color, which instead is approximately constant all over the image, but by a variation of the number of yellowed fibers per unit area. Therefore, it can be considered a halftone image. Furthermore, there is no difference in terms of distribution of fiber coloration and maximum densities between the front and the rear of the image.

While the blood images could have come from a contact mechanism, the body image could not. The mapping between body-only image densities and expected cloth–body distances is not consistent with the image having been formed by direct contact with a body, as it is present even when it does not seem possible for the cloth to be in contact with the body.

Ultraviolet-fluorescence observations in some bloodstain regions have been interpreted as indicating that blood-related fluids may have reduced or prevented body-image formation in those areas, implying that the blood predated the image-forming process. This is further supported by microchemical tests in which, after protein material from blood-area fibers was removed, the linen fibers appeared similar to non-image fibers rather than to the body-image fibers.

=== Weaving pattern examination ===
The shroud is a large cloth woven in a 3/1 chevron herringbone twill, which according to the Scientific American requires a specific four-shaft treadle loom. Such floor looms appear in China around 1000 CE, with the four-shaft treadle loom only being introduced to Europe in the 13th century as indicated by Andrea Nicolotti and Susan Foulkes. In 2020, a test was conducted by weaver Antoinette Merete Olsen, who attempted to replicate the shroud's weave and size using the simpler warp-weighted loom of antiquity. Her results revealed that the Shroud of Turin must have been created on a treadle loom.

History Today added that no manufactured three-in-one herringbone linen weave like the shroud has ever been discovered in ancient archaeological sites. The only other surviving parallel is a 14th century block-printed textile held at the Victoria and Albert Museum in London. Additionally, the shroud's linen yarn features a counter-clockwise Z-twist, a spinning technique typical of medieval Western Europe, contrasting with the clockwise S-twist which was traditional to Ancient Egypt and the Levant.

=== Hypotheses on image origin ===
Numerous experimental attempts have reproduced individual characteristics of the Shroud's image on linen. At the same time, no method has yet been shown to replicate all of its macroscopic and microscopic properties simultaneously. As a result, the exact 13–14th century image-formation mechanism remains debated and unclear.

==== Painting ====
According to Walter McCrone, the technique used for producing the image on the shroud could well be the same as a medieval grisaille method described in Sir Charles Lock Eastlake's Methods and Materials of Painting of the Great Schools and Masters (1847). Eastlake describes in the chapter "Practice of Painting Generally During the XIVth Century" a special technique of painting on linen using tempera paint, which produces images with unusual transparent features that McCrone compares to the image on the shroud. McCrone also argued that the current image on the shroud may be fainter than the original painting, due to the rubbing off of the ochre pigment from the tops of the exposed linen fibers over the course of several centuries of handling and exhibition of the fabric. In the 1980s artist Walter Sanford worked with McCrone to make a test copy of the Shroud using 14th-century artistic techniques and the same dilute formula discovered on the linen.

Charles Freeman supported McCrone's findings, arguing the stains are too red to be dried blood, and there was an absence of potassium. Moreover, he considered the features and discoveries made by STURP, such as image superficiality, calcium carbonate, animal collagen, and plant gum containing alizarin, as aligning with medieval textile painting methods described in Cennino Cennini's manual II Libro dell'Arte (1400), where gesso was scraped on linen to hold tempera paint on only the outer fibers without soaking into the cloth. He stated STURP lacked expertise in medieval art techniques, and their findings need reassessment due to 35 years of development in microscopy.

Andrea Nicolotti declared "We have known for four centuries that the image on the Shroud is flat, like a rectangular projection, and could not have been created by contact with a three-dimensional body."

==== Acid pigmentation ====
In 2009 Luigi Garlaschelli, professor of organic chemistry at the University of Pavia, stated that he had made a full-size reproduction of the Shroud of Turin using only medieval technologies. His cloth was woven in the exact same manner and herringbone pattern by yarn type and weight as the Shroud. Garlaschelli placed a linen sheet over a volunteer and then rubbed it with an acidic pigment for the body. The shroud was then aged in an oven before being washed to remove the pigment. He then added blood stains, scorches and water stains to replicate the original. Giulio Fanti, professor of mechanical and thermic measurements at the University of Padua, commented that "the technique itself seems unable to produce an image having the most critical Turin Shroud image characteristics". Garlaschelli noted that the microscopic properties of his reproductions can't be exactly identical to the original, as accelerated and artificial aging lasting 4 hours cannot replicate the natural centuries the Shroud of Turin has gone through. He therefore considered the criticisms of those who claim a need for an absolute similarity as specious.

Garlaschelli's reproduction was shown in a 2010 National Geographic documentary. Garlaschelli's technique included the bas-relief approach (described below) but only for the image of the face. The resultant image was visibly similar to the Turin Shroud, though lacking the uniformity and detail of the original.

==== Medieval photography ====
The art historian Nicholas Allen has proposed that the image on the shroud could have been formed as early as the 13th century using techniques described in the 1011 Book of Optics. However, according to Mike Ware, a chemist and expert on the history of photography, Allen's proposal "encounters serious obstacles with regard to the technical history of the lens. Such claimants tend to draw upon the wisdom of hindsight to project a distorted historical perspective, wherein their cases rest upon a particular concatenation of procedures which is exceedingly improbable; and their 'proofs' amount only to demonstrating (none too faithfully) that it was not totally impossible." Among other difficulties, Allen's hypothesized process would have required that the subject (a corpse) be exposed in the sunlight for months.

==== Dust-transfer technique ====
The scientists Emily Craig and Randall Bresee have attempted to recreate the likenesses of the shroud through the dust-transfer technique, which could have been done by medieval arts. They first did a carbon-dust drawing of a Jesus-like face (using collagen dust) on a newsprint made from wood pulp (which is similar to 13th- and 14th-century paper). They next placed the drawing on a table and covered it with a piece of linen. They then pressed the linen against the newsprint by firmly rubbing with the flat side of a wooden spoon. By doing this they managed to create a reddish-brown image with a lifelike positive likeness of a person, a three-dimensional image and no sign of brush strokes.

==== Bas-relief ====
In 1978 Joe Nickell noted that the Shroud image had a three-dimensional quality and thought its creation may have involved a sculpture of some type. He advanced the hypothesis that a medieval rubbing technique was used to produce the image, and set out to demonstrate this. He noted that while wrapping a cloth around a sculpture with normal contours would result in a distorted image, Nickell believed that wrapping a cloth over a bas-relief might result in an image like the one seen on the shroud, as it would eliminate wraparound distortions. For his demonstration, Nickell wrapped a wet cloth around a bas-relief sculpture and allowed it to dry. He then applied powdered pigment rather than wet paint (to prevent it soaking into the threads). The pigment was applied with a dauber, similar to making a rubbing from a gravestone. The result was an image with dark regions and light regions convincingly arranged. In a photo essay in Popular Photography magazine, Nickell demonstrated this technique step-by-step. (Note: For his pigment, Nickell first used the burial spices myrrh and aloes, but changed to red iron oxide (the pigment red ocher) when microanalyst, Walter McCrone identified it as constituting the shroud's image; McCrone had identified the blood as red ochre and vermilion tempera paint.) Other researchers later replicated this process.

In 2005 the researcher Jacques di Costanzo constructed a bas-relief of a Jesus-like face and draped wet linen over it. After the linen dried, he dabbed it with a mixture of ferric oxide and gelatine. The result was an image similar to that of the face on the Shroud. The imprinted image turned out to be wash-resistant, impervious to temperatures of 250 °C (482 °F) and was undamaged by exposure to a range of harsh chemicals, including bisulphite, which, without the gelatine, would normally have degraded ferric oxide to the compound ferrous oxide.

Instead of painting, it has been suggested that the bas-relief could also be heated and used to scorch an image onto the cloth. However researcher Thibault Heimburger performed some experiments with the scorching of linen, and found that a scorch mark is only produced by direct contact with the hot object—thus producing an all-or-nothing discoloration with no graduation of color as is found in the shroud.

==== Maillard reaction ====
The Maillard reaction is a form of non-enzymatic browning involving an amino acid and a reducing sugar. The cellulose fibers of the shroud are coated with a thin carbohydrate layer of starch fractions, various sugars, and other impurities. The potential source for amines required for the reaction is a decomposing body, and no signs of decomposition have been found on the Shroud. Rogers also notes that their tests revealed that there were no proteins or bodily fluids on the image areas. Also, the image resolution and the uniform coloration of the linen resolution seem to be incompatible with a mechanism involving diffusion.

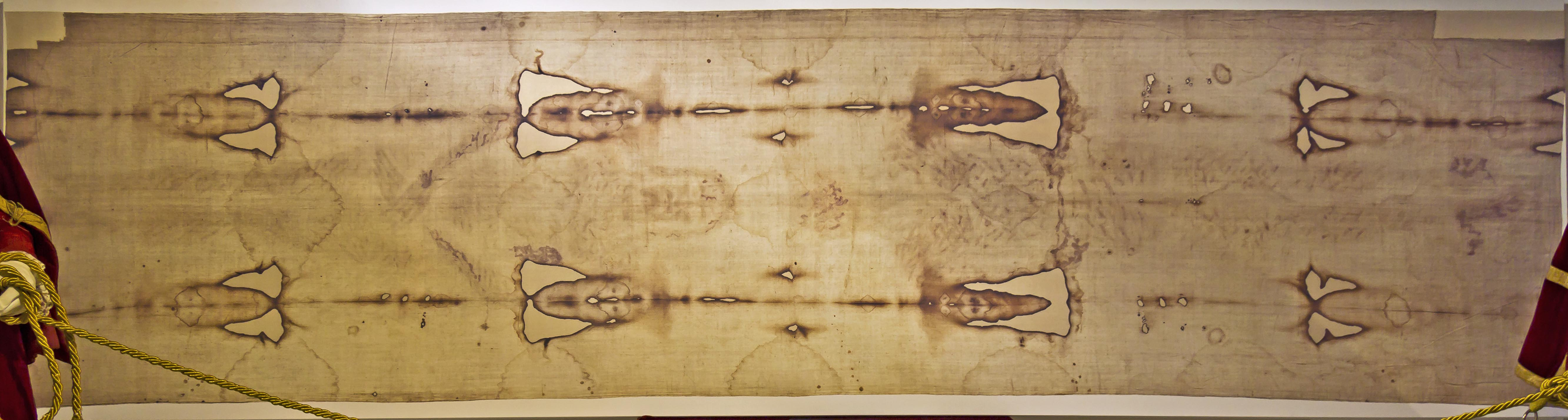
Replica of the Shroud of Turin, found in the Real Santuario del Cristo de La Laguna in Tenerife (Spain)

== Fringe theories ==
=== Images of coins, flowers, and writing ===
Various people claim to have detected images of flowers on the shroud as well as coins over the eyes of the face in the image, writing, and other objects. However, a study published in 2011 by Lorusso and others subjected two photographs of the shroud to detailed modern digital image processing, one of them being a reproduction of the photographic negative taken by Giuseppe Enrie in 1931. They did not find any images of flowers or coins or writing or any other additional objects on the shroud in either photograph, they noted the faint images were "only visible by incrementing the photographic contrast" so they concluded that these signs might be linked to protuberances in the yarn and possibly also to the alteration and influence of the texture of the Enrie photographic negative during its development in 1931. The use of coins to cover the eyes of the dead is not attested for 1st-century Judaea. The existence of the coin images is rejected by most scientists.

=== Pray Codex ===
An image in the medieval manuscript of the Pray Codex (c. 1192–1195) has generated a debate among some believers since 1978. Although the Pray Codex predates the Shroud of Turin, some of the assumed features of the drawing, including the four L-shaped holes on the coffin lid, have pointed some people towards a possible attempted representation of the linen cloth. However the image on the Pray Codex has crosses on what may be one side of the supposed shroud, an interlocking step pyramid pattern on the other, and no image of Jesus. Critics point out that it may not be a shroud at all, but rather a rectangular tombstone, as seen on other sacred images. A crumpled cloth can be seen discarded on the coffin, and the text of the codex fails to mention any miraculous image on the codex shroud.

=== Radiation processes ===
Some proponents for the authenticity of the Shroud of Turin have argued that the image on the shroud was created by some form of radiation emission at the "moment of resurrection". However, the STURP member Alan Adler has stated that this theory is not generally accepted as scientific, given that it runs counter to the laws of physics, while agreeing that the darkening of the fabric could be produced by exposure to light (and predicting that despite the fact that the Shroud is normally stored in darkness and rarely displayed, it will eventually become darker in the future). Raymond Rogers also criticized the theory, saying: "It is clear that a corona discharge (plasma) in air will cause easily observable changes in a linen sample. No such effects can be observed in image fibers from the Shroud of Turin. Corona discharges or plasmas made no contribution to image formation." Even if ultraviolet radiation were proven to have formed the image, it cannot be proven that it was not natural, that of the sun, applied to the prepared cloth unevenly to create the image. Others have hypothesized that an earthquake after Jesus’ death could have released a burst of neutrons that irradiated the shroud and changed some of the nuclei to different isotopes by neutron capture.

== See also ==
- Relics associated with Jesus
  - Seamless robe
- List of photographs considered the most important
