= McCrone report =

Document on the Scottish economy

The McCrone report is a document on the Scottish economy written and researched in 1974 on behalf of the British Government. It was composed by Professor Gavin McCrone employed at the Scottish Office using some information that was publicly available at the time. The document gave a favourable projection for the economy of an independent Scotland with a "chronic surplus to a quite embarrassing degree and its currency would become the hardest in Europe". It also noted that the Common Market or EEC meant that Scotland could pivot away from the rest of UK (if required) for trade. The report became public in 2005 when new freedom of information legislation came into effect.

The McCrone report occupies a significant position in the mythology of Scottish nationalism: the memo from UK civil servants to government ministers was confidential, and Scottish nationalists have argued that this was a cover-up to prevent the report's alleged predictions of huge oil revenues from fuelling independence sentiment in Scotland. However, such ministerial briefings are not intended for general publication, and Gavin McCrone himself has criticised the suggestion that there was a cover-up. The report's figures were also publicly debated in Parliament at the time, and had been widely reported in the British and Scottish media.

== Report content ==
The eighteen-page report focused on the likely effects of North Sea oil revenue on the economic viability of an independent Scotland. The report stated:

The DTI estimates of last summer showed that total Government revenue following adoption of these measures would have been between £800m. and £1,200m a year in 1980 depending on the system used and the prices prevailing in 1980; today, following the huge increase in international oil prices of recent months the corresponding figures are in the range of £1,500m to over £3,000m. Thus, all that is wrong now with the SNP (Scottish National Party) estimate is that it is far too low; there is a prospect of Government oil revenues in 1980 which could greatly exceed the present Government revenue in Scotland from all sources and could even be comparable in size to the whole of the Scottish national income in 1970.

It concluded:

It must be concluded therefore that revenues and large balance of payments gains would indeed accrue to a Scottish Government in the event of independence provided that steps were taken either by carried interest or by taxation to secure the Government 'take'. Undoubtedly this would banish any anxieties the Government might have had about its budgetary position or its balance of payments. The country would tend to be in chronic surplus to a quite embarrassing degree and its currency would become the hardest in Europe with the exception perhaps of the Norwegian kroner. Just as deposed monarchs and African leaders have in the past used the Swiss franc as a haven of security, as now would the Scottish pound be seen as a good hedge against inflation and devaluation and the Scottish banks could expect to find themselves inundated with speculative inflow of foreign funds.

== UK political environment ==
The document was dated 27 February 1974, one day prior to the February 1974 general election, and was produced as part of a series of briefing papers for a new incoming government. This election produced a 'hung parliament' with Harold Wilson of the Labour Party as Prime Minister. Another general election was called for October 1974, which gave Labour a slim majority in Westminster. The Scottish National Party recorded 30% of the Scottish vote in the October election, their best ever result at that time.

On 25 February 1975, less than a year after the McCrone report was made, the Paymaster General, Edmund Dell, made a statement in the House of Commons on Petroleum Revenue Tax. Dell was asked by Gordon Wilson, the MP for Dundee East and the SNP's energy spokesperson, for what the British government expected the revenues from oil would be. Dell answered:

The hon. Member asked for an estimate of revenues on the basis of certain figures of oil production in – I take it – the 1980s. He will understand that in the early years the revenue from North Sea oil will be relatively small but growing fast. In the early 1980s, at a figure of 100 million tons, it should be £2,000 million or £3,000 million. Of course, the higher the production the greater the consequent revenues. However, all figures in this respect must be treated with some caution because they depend, first, on the price of oil and, secondly, on the cost of exploration and development. I therefore suggest to the hon. Gentleman that we wait to see what we get before relying on it too much.

Dell's answer was drawn citing the numbers from the McCrone report. Far from a cover-up, promises of a significant windfall from North Sea oil were public knowledge and were widely reported in the UK and Scottish media. Despite predictions of high oil revenues being broadly reported in the national press, the Scottish National Party failed to make a significant electoral breakthrough in the subsequent 1979 general election, losing nine of its eleven MPs.

== Publication and reactions ==
The report came to light in 2005 when the SNP obtained several UK Government papers under the Freedom of Information Act 2000. The full provisions of the Act came into force on 1 January 2005. Even though similar figures to those in the McCrone report were widely reported in the 1970s, Scottish nationalists have regularly presented the report as being deliberately covered up to hide oil revenue forecasts from the Scottish public and prevent growth in support for Scottish independence.

UK oil production peaked in 1999 and had declined 67% by 2012, but petroleum still contributed £35bn to the UK balance of payments in 2011. The UK government took an estimated £6,530m in direct petroleum taxes in 2012-13 plus £6bn in income tax, national insurance and corporation tax from supply companies in 2011-12. As of 2012, around 45% of UK oil & gas employees were located in Scotland. The North Sea oil and gas industry as a whole contributed £35 billion to the UK Treasury in 2014.

In his evidence to the Lords Committee on the Economic Implications of Scottish Independence in 2012, Professor McCrone stated that Scotland's GDP would increase by around 20% if North Sea oil were counted as part of it.

In an interview for Holyrood Magazine on 19 May 2013, ex-Labour chancellor Denis Healey (who served in the Cabinet at the time the McCrone Report was submitted) stated: "I think we did underplay the value of the oil to the country because of the threat of [Scottish] nationalism... I think they [Westminster politicians] are concerned about Scotland taking the oil, I think they are worried stiff about it."

Gavin McCrone has rejected any suggestion that his report was covered up, writing in 2022; "There have been suggestions in the press that my paper was suppressed or in some way hushed up. This was not so. It was a confidential briefing for Ministers and never intended for publication, just as other briefing papers for Ministers are confidential."

== See also ==
- Government Pension Fund of Norway
- Sovereign wealth fund
- Commission on Scottish Devolution
- Dutch disease
- Government Expenditure and Revenue Scotland
- Resource curse
