= Lirey =

Commune in Grand Est, France

- Commune
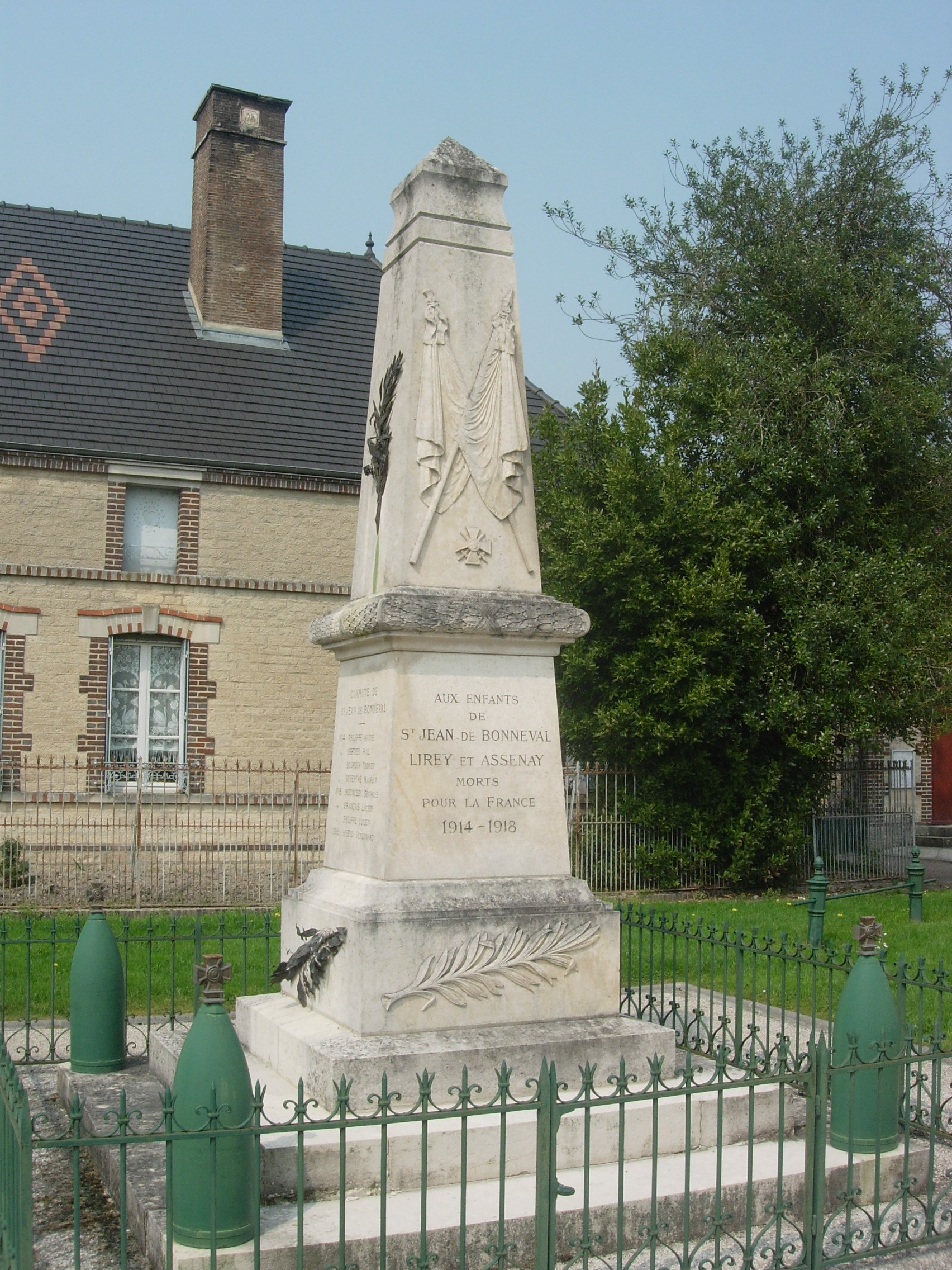
- War memorial
- Location of Lirey
- Location within France Location within Grand Est
- Coordinates: 48°09′27″N 4°02′53″E
- Country: France
- Region: Grand Est
- Department: Aube
- Arrondissement: Troyes
- Canton: Les Riceys
- Intercommunality: CA Troyes Champagne Métropole

Government
  - Mayor (2020–2026): David Frapin
- Area^{1}: 4.84 km^{2} (1.87 sq mi)
- Elevation: 138 m (453 ft)
- Population (2023): 116
  - Density: 24.0/km^{2} (62.1/sq mi)
- Time zone: UTC+01:00 (CET)
  - Summer (DST): UTC+02:00 (CEST)
- INSEE/Postal code: 10198 /10320
- ^{1} French Land Register data, which excludes lakes, ponds, glaciers > 1 km^{2} (0.386 sq mi or 247 acres) and river estuaries.

Lirey (French pronunciation: [liʁɛ]) is a commune in the Aube department in north-central France.

The Shroud of Turin was found and exposed in the collegiate church created by Geoffroi de Charny in Lirey between about 1355 and 1418, before its transfer to the Château de Montfort (Cote-d'Or), then to Chambéry, then to Turin.

== Population ==
Historical population
Year	Pop.	±% p.a.
1968	77	—
1975	59	−3.73%
1982	65	+1.39%
1990	93	+4.58%
1999	94	+0.12%
2007	89	−0.68%
2012	111	+4.52%
2017	104	−1.29%
2023	116	+1.84%
Source: INSEE

== See also ==
- Communes of the Aube department
