= Walter McCrone =

American chemist (1916–2002)

Walter C. McCrone
- Born: June 9, 1916; Wilmington, Delaware, US
- Died: July 10, 2002 (aged 86); Chicago, Illinois, US
- Education: Cornell University
- Known for: Polarized light microscopy Polymorphism; Ultra-microanalysis; Vinland Map; Shroud of Turin
- Awards: ACS Award in Analytical Chemistry (2000)
- Scientific career
- Fields: Chemistry, Microscopy, Forensic science
- Workplaces: Cornell University, Illinois Institute of Technology, McCrone Research Institute
- Thesis: I. Derivatives of endomethylene tetrahydrophthalic acid II. Fusion methods in the study of crystals
- Doctoral advisor: Clyde W. Mason

Walter Cox McCrone Jr. (June 9, 1916 – July 10, 2002) was an American chemist who worked extensively on applications of polarized light microscopy and is sometimes characterized as the "father of modern microscopy". He was also an expert in electron microscopy, crystallography, ultra-microanalysis, and particle identification. In 1960 he founded the McCrone Research Institute, a non-profit educational and research organization for microscopy based in Chicago.

McCrone's crystallographic work on polymorphism and its pharmaceutical applications played a central role in the subsequent development of the field. To the general public, McCrone was best known for his work in forensic science, especially his analyses of the Vinland Map and the Shroud of Turin. In 2000, he received the American Chemical Society's National Award in Analytical Chemistry.

== Biography ==
Walter McCrone was born in Wilmington, Delaware, but he grew up mostly in New York State. His father was a civil engineer in charge of one of the first DuPont plants to manufacture cellophane. McCrone received a bachelor's degree in chemistry from Cornell University in 1938 and a Ph.D. in organic chemistry from the same institution in 1942. From 1942 to 1944 he was a post-doctoral researcher at Cornell. In 1944, McCrone published a detailed study on The Microscopic Examination of High Explosives and Boosters.

In 1944, McCrone began to work as a microscopist and materials scientist at the Armour Research Foundation, now the Illinois Institute of Technology (IIT) Research Institute. He was also a professor at IIT and served as assistant chairman of its Chemistry and Chemical Engineering Department. In 1948, McCrone and IIT electron microscopist Charles F. Tufts organized the first of the meetings that are now the International Microscopy Conference (Inter/Micro). Among the speakers at the first conference was Nobel laureate Frits Zernike.

In 1956, McCrone left IIT and founded an analytical consulting firm, McCrone Associates, which is now located in Westmont, Illinois. In 1960, he established the McCrone Research Institute, a nonprofit organization for teaching and research in microscopy and crystallography, based in Chicago. In 1979, he retired from McCrone Associates in order to dedicate himself to teaching full time. The proceeds from his work as a consulting chemist allowed McCrone to endow the Émile M. Chamot Professorship of Chemistry at Cornell, named in honor of McCrone's university mentor. According to chemist and forensic scientist John A. Reffner, "during McCrone's life, he taught microscopy to more students than anyone else in history".

For more than thirty years McCrone edited and published The Microscope, an international quarterly journal of microscopy that had been established in 1937 by the British microscopist Arthur L. E. Barron. McCrone also wrote more than 400 technical articles along with sixteen books or chapters. He is credited with expanding the usefulness of the optical microscopy to chemists, who had previously regarded it as primarily a tool for biologists. One of his publications was the Particle Atlas, first published in 1967, which provided an exhaustive description of small particles and how to identify them with the aid of a microscope. That work became widely used in forensic laboratories. The Particle Atlas, which was written in collaboration with other staff members of McCrone Associates, appeared in a six-volume second edition in 1973. In 1992, it became available in CD-ROM.

Walter McCrone served on the board of directors and as president of the Ada S. McKinley Community Services, a nonprofit social services agency in Chicago. McCrone also served on the Board of Trustees of VanderCook College of Music in Chicago. VanderCook is the only college or university in the nation to offer only Bachelors and Masters degrees in Music Education. He died of congestive heart failure at his home in Chicago, at the age of 86. From 1957 until his death in 2002, he was married to Lucy B. McCrone, née Beman. The two had met while she was working as an analytical chemist for the management consulting firm Arthur D. Little, in Cambridge, Massachusetts. After their marriage, Lucy McCrone worked as a chemical microanalyst for McCrone Associates in Chicago and was co-founder and director of the McCrone Research Institute until 1984.

== Polymorphism ==
In the 1950s and 1960s, McCrone conducted extensive research on the microscopic characterization of polymorphs, which he defined as materials that are "different in crystal structure but identical in the liquid or vapor states". He investigated the difference in the properties of polymorphs of medications, co-authoring with John Haleblian a review article on "the pharmaceutical application of polymorphism", published in 1969. McCrone's work on polymorphism exerted a strong influence upon the scientific career of Joel Bernstein.

== Vinland Map ==
The Vinland Map appears to be a 15th-century mappa mundi showing a landmass in the Atlantic Ocean, directly south-west of Greenland, labelled Vinlanda Insula ("Isle of Vinland"). It first came to light in 1957 and was acquired by Yale University in 1964. The map's authenticity would have demonstrated the awareness of European cartographers of a part of the American continent, before the voyages of Christopher Columbus. McCrone, already reputed for his expertise in authenticating ancient documents and works of art, was asked by Yale to analyze the map in 1972. In 1974, he published evidence that the ink of the map contained synthetic anatase (a form of titanium dioxide), a substance not used as a pigment until the 1920s. McCrone detected the anatase in the yellow ink that the forger used to simulate the natural discoloration that appears over long periods of time around lines drawn on parchment in medieval iron gall ink.

McCrone's work on the Vinland Map led to a protracted controversy, with other researchers continuing to argue for the document's authenticity and discounting the presence of anatase as insignificant. In 2021, Raymond Clemens, the curator of early books and manuscripts at Yale's Beinecke Rare Book & Manuscript Library where the map is housed, declared that it had been conclusively shown to be a fake. That judgment was largely based on the presence of synthetic anatase in the ink, as first identified by McCrone.

== Shroud of Turin ==
As a result of McCrone's work on the Vinland Map, British author and researcher Ian Wilson approached McCrone in 1974 about the possibility of scientifically analyzing the Shroud of Turin, a length of linen cloth that has been venerated for centuries as the burial shroud of Jesus upon which his image is miraculously imprinted. This led to McCrone's involvement with the Shroud of Turin Research Project (STURP). In 1977, a team of scientists affiliated with STURP proposed a barrage of tests to be carried out on the Shroud. With permission from the Archbishop of Turin, Cardinal Anastasio Ballestrero, STURP researchers conducted tests over a period of five days in October 1978, also using adhesive tape to obtain samples of the fibers from various parts on the Shroud's surface.

Based on his microscopic and chemical analysis of the tape samples obtained by STURP, McCrone concluded that the image on the Shroud was painted with a dilute pigment of red ochre in a collagen tempera (i.e., gelatin) medium, using a technique similar to the grisaille employed in the 14th century by Simone Martini and other European artists. McCrone also found that the "bloodstains" in the image had been highlighted with vermilion (a bright red pigment made from mercury sulfide), also in a collagen tempera medium. McCrone reported that no actual blood was present in the samples taken from the Shroud.

McCrone's results were rejected by other members of STURP and McCrone resigned from STURP in June 1980. Two other members of STURP, John Heller and Alan Adler, published their own analysis concluding that Shroud did show traces of blood. Other STURP members also disputed McCrone's conclusion that the Shroud image was painted, finding that physical analyses excluded the presence of pigments in sufficient quantities to account for the visible image.

McCrone continued to defend his results and to insist that polarized light microscopy, in which he was the only expert among the original members of STURP, was the correct technique to apply to the study of the Shroud. In 1983, he confidently predicted that radiocarbon dating of the Shroud's linen would show that it had been made shortly before the first historically recorded exhibition of the Shroud in 1356. The results of the 1988 radiocarbon dating of the Shroud vindicated McCrone's microscopic and chemical analyses.

McCrone re-stated and summarized his evidence that the Shroud was painted in an article published in 1990 in the journal Accounts of Chemical Research. He later wrote a book on the subject, Judgment Day for the Shroud of Turin, published in 1996 by the McCrone Research Institute's Microscope Publications and re-issued in 1999 by Prometheus Books. In 2000, the American Chemical Society presented McCrone with its National Award in Analytical Chemistry for his work on the Shroud and for "his enduring patience for the defense of his methodologies".

== Other investigations ==
McCrone's work as a microscopist first attracted widespread public attention when he helped exonerate Lloyd Eldon Miller, a cabdriver who had been sentenced to death for the 1955 murder of an 8-year-old girl in Canton, Illinois. McCrone was able to show that the stains in a pair of undershorts that the prosecution had presented to the jury as blood were actually red paint. Miller's conviction was overturned by the US Supreme Court in 1967. In later life, McCrone microscopically examined the physical evidence (hairs, fibers, blood, etc.) that led to the conviction of Wayne Williams as the Atlanta child killer. That work earned him the 1982 Certificate of Merit from the Forensic Sciences Foundation.

On occasion, McCrone was given hair samples of famous people to analyze. Based on such analysis, he rejected the hypothesis that Napoleon had been poisoned with arsenic, but concluded that Beethoven had suffered from lead poisoning.

== Posthumous recognition ==
The executive council of the Committee for Skeptical Inquiry (CSI) voted in April 2011 to include Walter McCrone in its "Pantheon of Skeptics". The Pantheon of Skeptics commemorates deceased distinguished fellows of CSI and their exceptional contributions to the cause of scientific skepticism.
