= McCrone Research Institute =

Microscopy research organization

Coordinates: 41°50′33.5″N 87°37′27.7″W

- Type: Independent, Not-For-Profit
- Established: October 6, 1960; 65 years ago
- Students: More than 30,000 since 1960
- Location: Chicago, IL, USA
- Website: mccroneinstitute.org

The McCrone Research Institute is a not-for-profit educational and research organization for microscopy located in Chicago, Illinois. It was founded by Dr. Walter C. McCrone in 1960. With more than 30,000 enrollments since its incorporation, it is the largest private, independent, nonprofit microscopy and microanalysis institution in the United States dedicated solely to the teaching of microscopists. McCrone Research Institute maintains over one hundred polarized light and various other light microscopes in addition to electron microscopes, spectrometers, and scientific digital imaging systems for use in any of its over 50 intensive one-week courses offered each year.

The McCrone Research Institute incorporates enhanced lecture rooms and laboratories, a museum, library, reference collections, atlases, databases, and other teaching materials relating to microscopy and microanalysis in its own 11,000 square feet (1,000 m^{2}) building and is the principal microscopy training organization for tens of thousands of practicing scientists in environmental, forensic, industrial, government, and university laboratories worldwide.

The McCrone Research Institute also conducts basic and applied scientific research related to its mission of expanding particle analysis capabilities and using microscopical and microanalytical techniques to address problems in forensic, industrial, pharmaceutical, environmental and conservation sciences. This research is currently funded internally and by selected grants, contracts and cooperative agreements associated with a variety of academic institutions, government agencies and corporations. Located in the same Chicago neighborhood since its inception in 1960, McCrone Research Institute is recognized as a world-class, Illinois research organization on the forefront of the technological frontier.

Microscope Publications, a division of the McCrone Research Institute, is publisher and provider of microscopy textbooks, handbooks, and atlases including The Particle Atlas, the world's first atlas of microscopic particles, The Microscope Series Handbooks, and the international journal, The Microscope, founded in 1937.

The McCrone Research Institute sponsors the Inter/Micro Conference in Chicago. These meetings were first organized in 1948 and feature a symposium, exhibition, and workshops on light and electron microscopy. Each year since 1984 Brian J. Ford has presented the popular "An Evening with Brian" which offers controversial views of world affairs from a microscopist's viewpoint. Additionally, the institute maintains a program for certification in applied chemical microscopy and awards certificates for successful completion of its microscopy and microanalysis courses.
