= Fringe theories about the Shroud of Turin =

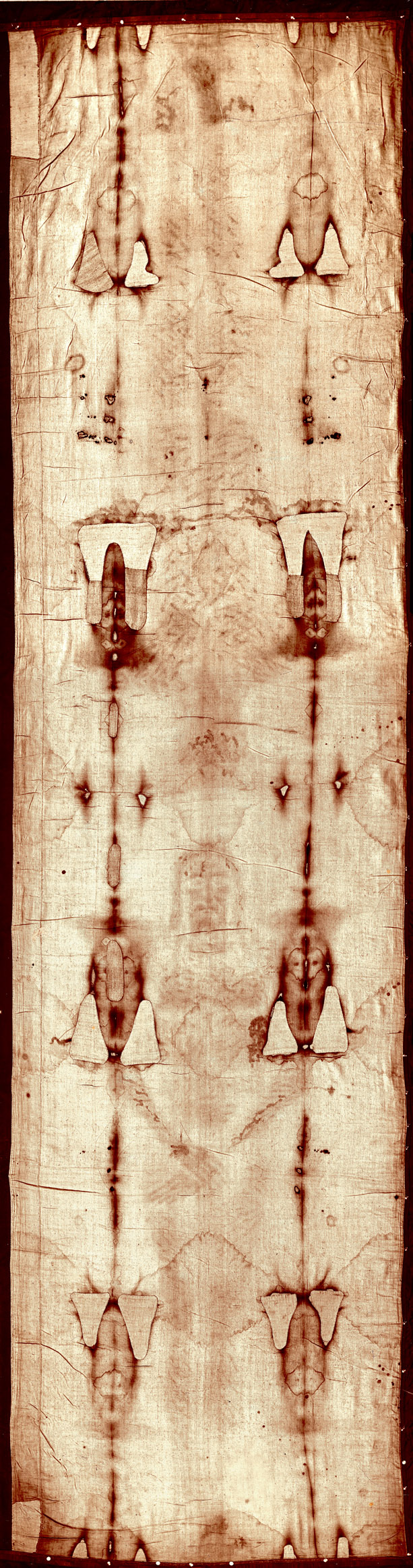
Full-length image of the Turin Shroud before the 2002 restoration.

The Shroud of Turin is a length of linen cloth bearing the imprint of the image of a man, and is believed by some to be the burial shroud of Jesus. Despite conclusive scientific evidence from three radiocarbon dating tests performed in 1988 which resulted in the shroud being dated to 1260–1390 AD correlating with its appearance in history, some researchers have challenged the dating based on various theories, including the provenance of the samples used for testing, biological or chemical contamination, incorrect assessment of carbon dating data, as well as other theories. However, the alternative theories challenging the radiocarbon dating have been disproved by mainstream scientists using actual shroud material, and are thus considered to be fringe theories.

The Holy See received custody of the shroud in 1983, and as with other religious relics, makes no claims about its authenticity. After the 1988 round of tests, no further dating tests have been allowed.

== Overview ==
The Shroud of Turin is a large length of linen cloth (14 ft 5 in × 3 ft 7 in) bearing the negative image of a man who is alleged to be Jesus of Nazareth. The cloth itself is believed by some to be the burial shroud he was wrapped in when he was buried after his crucifixion. The origins of the shroud and its images are the subject of multiple fringe theories. Diverse arguments have been made in various publications claiming to prove that the cloth is the authentic burial shroud of Jesus, based on disciplines ranging from chemistry to biology and medical forensics to optical image analysis.

In 1988, three radiocarbon dating tests dated a sample of the shroud as being from the Middle Ages, between the years 1260 and 1390. Some shroud researchers have challenged this dating. However, the scientific hypotheses used to challenge the radiocarbon dating have been scientifically refuted, e.g. the medieval repair hypothesis, the bio-contamination hypothesis and the carbon monoxide hypothesis. The highly respected journal Nature put it in 1989, when writing about the radiocarbon dating: "These tests provide conclusive evidence that the linen of the Shroud of Turin is mediaeval." However, a 2019 article published in Archaeometry which studied the raw data concluded that "without this re-analysis, it is not possible to affirm that the 1988 radiocarbon dating offers 'conclusive evidence' that the calendar age range is accurate and representative of the whole cloth." They said there was a necessity for a new radiocarbon dating test to compute a new reliable interval, and that "this new test requires, in an interdisciplinary research, a robust protocol". Nonetheless, the publication indicated every lab's measurement remained within the 13th and 14th centuries, meaning the statistical heterogeneity affected precision within the medieval period, rather than indicating an ancient origin. A study in 2020 stated the 1988 dating range needs to be adjusted by just 10 years to resolve the inhomogeneity, and a larger margin of 88 years in order to properly meet the full agreement of 95% confidence intervals.

Proponents for the authenticity of the Shroud of Turin argue that empirical analysis and scientific methods are insufficient for understanding the methods used for image formation on the shroud, believing that the image was miraculously produced at the moment of resurrection. Some proponents have argued that the image on the shroud can be explained with scientific evidence that supports the Gospel narrative. John P. Jackson (a member of the Shroud of Turin Research Project (STURP)) proposed that the image was formed by radiation methods beyond the understanding of current science, in particular via the "collapsing cloth" onto a body that was radiating energy at the moment of resurrection. However, STURP member Alan Adler has stated that Jackson's theory is not generally accepted as scientific, given that it runs counter to the laws of physics, while agreeing that the darkening of the fabric could be produced by exposure to light (and all of the fabric will slowly become darker in the future). In 1989 physicist Thomas Phillips speculated that the Shroud image was formed by neutron radiation caused by a miraculous bodily resurrection. Studies have suggested that all radiation hypotheses regarding the formation of the Shroud’s body image should be rejected.

== Speculations about early artworks and relics ==
The Image of Edessa was reported to contain the image of the face of Jesus, and its existence is reported since the sixth century. Some have suggested a connection between the Shroud of Turin and the Image of Edessa. No legend connected with that image suggests that it contained the image of a beaten and bloody Jesus. It was said to be an image transferred by Jesus to the cloth in life. This image is generally described as depicting only the face of Jesus, not the entire body. Proponents of the theory that the Edessa image was actually the shroud, led by Ian Wilson, theorize that it was always folded in such a way as to show only the face, as recorded in the apocryphical Acts of Thaddeus from around that time, which say it was tradiplon – folded into four pieces.

Ian Wilson, under 'Reconstructed Chronology of the Turin Shroud' recounts that the 'Doctrine of Addai' mentions a 'mysterious portrait' in connection with the healing of Abgar V. A similar story is recorded in Eusebius' History of the Church bk 1, ch 13, which does not mention the portrait.

Three principal pieces of evidence are cited in favor of the identification with the shroud. Saint John of Damascus mentions the image in his anti-iconoclastic work On Holy Images, describing the Edessa image as being a "strip", or oblong cloth, rather than a square, as other accounts of the Edessa cloth hold. However, in his description, St. John still speaks of the image of Jesus' face when he was alive.

In several articles, Daniel Scavone, professor emeritus of history at the University of Southern Indiana, puts forward a hypothesis which identifies the Shroud of Turin as the real object that inspires the romances of the Holy Grail.

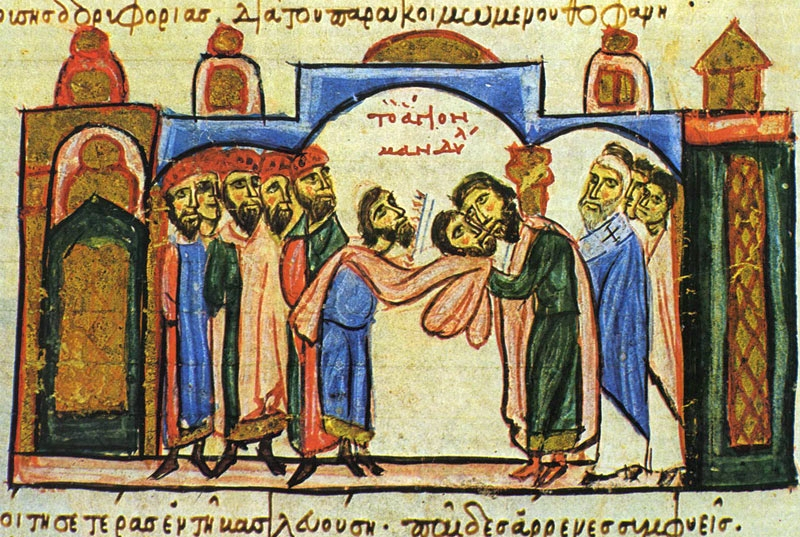
The surrender of the Image of Edessa to the Byzantine parakoimomenos Theophanes by the Edessenes, from the 12th century Madrid Skylitzes

To the contrary, Averil Cameron, expert of late antique and Byzantine history at the University of Oxford, and historian Andrea Nicolotti of the University of Turin, reject the possibility of the Turin shroud being identified with the Image of Edessa. Among the reasons are too big differences in the historical descriptions of the Image of Edessa compared to the later shroud. The Image of Edessa according to Cameron, has its origin in the resistance to the Byzantine iconoclasm.

André-Marie Dubarle argued that a 944 sermon by Gregory Referendarius, archdeacon of Hagia Sophia in Constantinople, given upon the arrival of the Image of Edessa, references a full-body image and a side wound on the cloth. To support a connection, proponents cite Codex Vossianus Latinus Q69, a 10th century Latin manuscript in Leiden. It reads: "Non tantum faciei figuram sed totius corporis figuram cernere poteris" ("You can see not only the figure of a face, but [also] the figure of the whole body"). Although the sermon was rediscovered in the Vatican Archives and translated by Mark Guscin in 2004, Guscin rejects the claim that it describes the Shroud of Turin. He notes Gregory attributes the image to sweat shed in Gethsemane before the crucifixion, rather than to burial linens. The references to blood and water are theological metaphors rather than physical marks on a cloth.

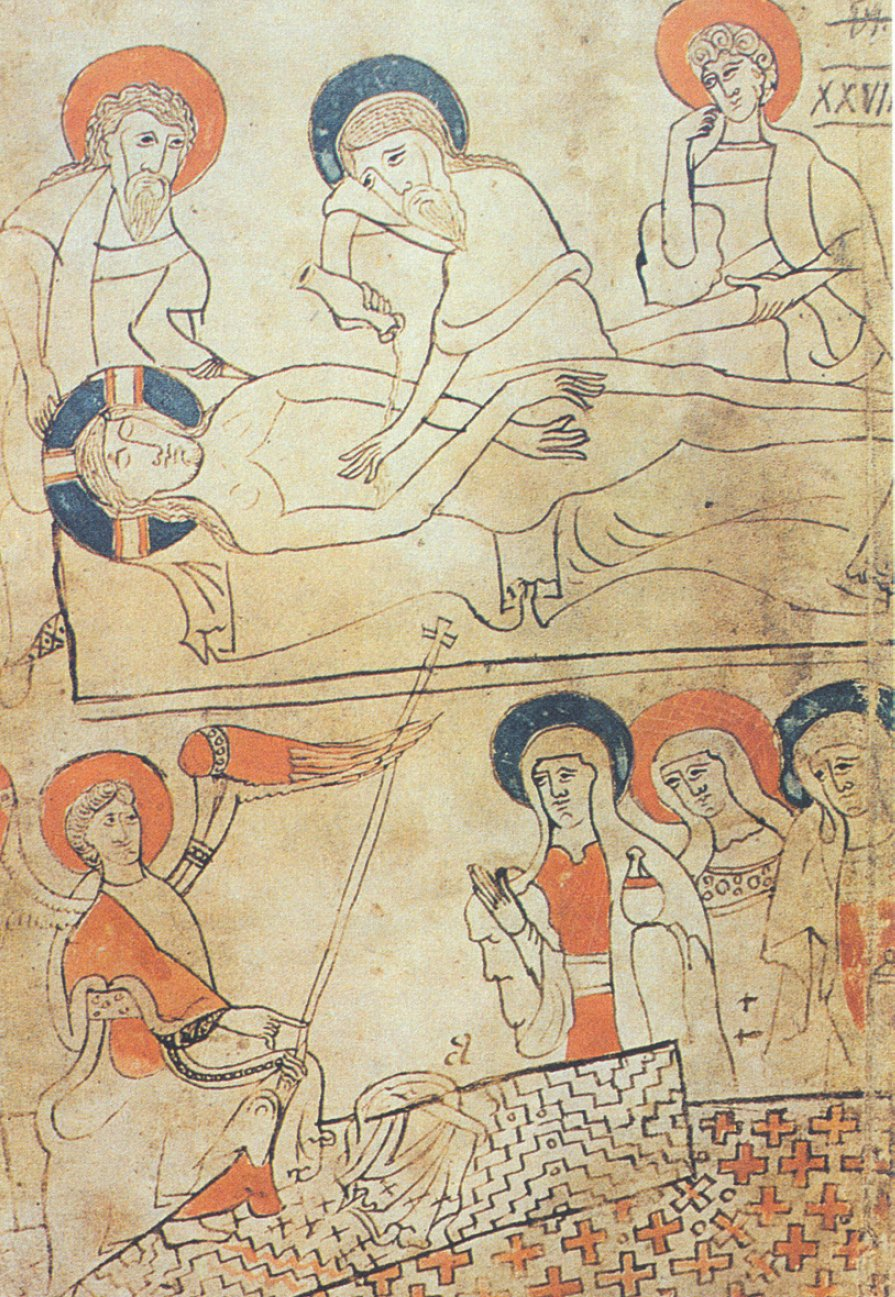
The Pray Codex, c. 13th century. Shroud proponents cite it as evidence for the shroud's existence before the fourteenth century. Critics point out that inter alia that there is no image on the alleged shroud.

The Codex Pray, an Illuminated manuscript written in Budapest, Hungary between 1192 and 1195, includes an illustration of what appears to some to be the Shroud of Turin. Currently in the Budapest National Library, it is the oldest surviving text of the Hungarian language, and it was created at least 65 years before the earliest carbon-14 date in the 1988 tests. One of its illustrations shows preparations for the burial of Christ. The picture supposedly includes a burial cloth in the post-resurrection scene. According to proponents, it has the same herringbone weave as the Shroud, plus four holes near one of the edges. The holes form an "L" shape. Proponents claim this odd pattern of holes is the same as the ones found on the Shroud of Turin. They are burn holes, perhaps from a hot poker or incense embers. On the other hand, Italian Shroud researcher Gian Marco Rinaldi interprets the item that is sometimes identified as the Shroud as a probable rectangular tombstone as seen on other sacred images. He sees the alleged holes as decorative elements, as are also seen on the angel's wing and clothes. Rinaldi also points out that the alleged shroud in the Pray codex does not contain any image. Furthermore, it would be most unlikely that anyone who had seen the Shroud would have shown Christ being buried without any sign of the wounds that are so graphically shown on the Shroud.

In 1204, a knight named Robert de Clari who participated in the Fourth Crusade that captured Constantinople, claims a cloth was among the countless relics in the city:

Where there was the Shroud in which our Lord had been wrapped, which every Friday raised itself upright so one could see the figure of our Lord on it. And none knows – neither Greek nor Frank – what became of that shroud when the city was taken.

(The apparent miracle of the cloth raising itself may be accounted for as a mistranslation: the French impersonal passive takes the form of a reflexive verb. Thus the original French could equally well be translated as the cloth was raised upright. De Clari's matter of fact delivery does not suggest that he witnessed anything out of the ordinary.) However, the historians Madden and Queller describe this part of Robert's account as a mistake: Robert had actually seen or heard of the sudarium, the handkerchief of Saint Veronica (which also purportedly contained the image of Jesus), and confused it with the grave cloth (sindon). In 1205, the following letter was allegedly sent by Theodore Angelos, a brother of Michael I Komnenos Doukas, to Pope Innocent III protesting the attack on the capital. From the document, dated 1 August 1205 in Rome:

The Venetians partitioned the treasures of gold, silver, and ivory while the French did the same with the relics of the saints and the most sacred of all, the linen in which our Lord Jesus Christ was wrapped after his death and before the resurrection. We know that the sacred objects are preserved by their predators in Venice, in France, and in other places, the sacred linen in Athens." (Codex Chartularium Culisanense, fol. CXXVI (copia), Bilioteca del Santuario di Montevergine)

According to Emmanuel Poulle, a French medievalist, although the Mandylion is not the Shroud of Turin, the texts "attest the presence of the Shroud in Constantinople before 1204". But it was investigated, and claimed by Nicolotti that the letter of Theodore and other documents contained in the Chartularium are modern forgeries.

== Defective sample theories ==
Allegations have been made that the sample of the shroud chosen for testing was defective in some way, usually involving questions about the provenance of the threads: for example that the sample chosen was not from the original shroud but from a repair or restoration carried out in the Middle Ages.

In a 2016 BBC interview, Michael S. Tite who coordinated the original radiocarbon dating supported the medieval origin of the Shroud and 1989 results.

=== Medieval repair argument ===
Although the quality of the radiocarbon testing itself is unquestioned, criticisms have been raised regarding the choice of the sample taken for testing, with suggestions that the sample may represent a medieval repair fragment rather than the image-bearing cloth. It is hypothesised that the sampled area was a medieval repair which was conducted by "invisible reweaving". Since the C14 dating at least four articles have been published in scholarly sources contending that the samples used for the dating test may not have been representative of the whole shroud. Nonetheless, a report in 2026 confirmed that the C14 samples came from and represented authentic pieces of the original and full textile.

=== Questionable provenance of samples ===
The medieval repair argument was included in an article by American chemist Raymond Rogers, who conducted chemical analysis for the Shroud of Turin Research Project (STURP) and who was involved in work with the Shroud since the STURP project began in 1978. Rogers took 32 documented adhesive-tape samples from all areas of the shroud and associated textiles during the STURP process in 1978. He received 14 yarn segments from Luigi Gonella (Department of Physics, Polytechnic University of Turin) on 14 October 1979, which Gonella told him were from the Raes sample. On 12 December 2003, Rogers received a tiny fragment of what he was told was a shroud warp thread, and a tiny fragment of what he was told was a shroud weft thread, which Luigi Gonella told him had been taken from the radiocarbon sample before it was distributed for dating. The actual provenance of these threads is uncertain, as Gonella was not authorized to take or retain genuine shroud material, but Gonella told Rogers that he excised the threads from the center of the radiocarbon sample.

Raymond Rogers stated in a 2005 article that he performed chemical analyses on these undocumented threads, and compared them to the undocumented Raes threads as well as the samples he had kept from his STURP work. He stated that his analysis showed: "The radiocarbon sample contains both a gum/dye/mordant coating and cotton fibers. The main part of the shroud does not contain these materials." He speculated that these products may have been used by medieval weavers to match the colour of the original weave when performing repairs and backing the shroud for additional protection. Based on this comparison Rogers concluded that the undocumented threads received from Gonella did not match the main body of the shroud, and that in his opinion: "The worst possible sample for carbon dating was taken."

In March 2013, Giulio Fanti, professor of mechanical and thermal measurement at the University of Padua conducted a battery of experiments on various threads that he believes were cut from the shroud during the 1988 carbon-14 dating, and concluded that they dated from 300 BC to 400 AD, potentially placing the Shroud within the lifetime of Jesus of Nazareth. Because of the manner in which Fanti obtained the shroud fibers, many are dubious about his findings. The shroud's official custodian, Archbishop Cesare Nosiglia of Turin, told Vatican Insider: "As there is no degree of safety on the authenticity of the materials on which these experiments were carried out [on] the shroud cloth, the shroud's custodians cannot recognize any serious value to the results of these alleged experiments."

Barrie Schwortz, a member of the original STURP investigation team, commented on Fanti's theory: "But it would be more convincing if the basic research had first been presented in a professional, peer-reviewed journal. If you're using old techniques in new ways, then you need to submit your approach to other scientists."

=== Contamination of sample theories ===
Various theories call into question results of carbon-14 dating, based on contamination by bacteria, reactive carbon, or carbon monoxide. However, as of a recent 2026 analysis it was shown that there was no evidence for any contamination.

==== By bacteria ====
Pictorial evidence dating from c. 1690 and 1842 indicates that the corner used for the dating and several similar evenly spaced areas along one edge of the cloth were handled each time the cloth was displayed, the traditional method being for it to be held suspended by a row of five bishops. Others contend that repeated handling of this kind greatly increased the likelihood of contamination by bacteria and bacterial residue compared to the newly discovered archaeological specimens for which carbon-14 dating was developed. Bacteria and associated residue (bacteria by-products and dead bacteria) carry additional carbon-14 that would skew the radiocarbon date toward the present.

Rodger Sparks, a radiocarbon expert from New Zealand, had countered that an error of thirteen centuries stemming from bacterial contamination in the Middle Ages would have required a layer approximately doubling the sample weight. Because such material could be easily detected, fibers from the shroud were examined at the National Science Foundation Mass Spectrometry Center of Excellence at the University of Nebraska. Pyrolysis-mass-spectrometry examination failed to detect any form of bioplastic polymer on fibers from either non-image or image areas of the shroud. Additionally, laser-microprobe Raman analysis at Instruments SA, Inc. in Metuchen, New Jersey, also failed to detect any bioplastic polymer on shroud fibers.

Harry Gove, director of Rochester's laboratory (one of the laboratories not selected to conduct the testing), once hypothesised that a "bioplastic" bacterial contamination, which was unknown during the 1988 testing, could have rendered the tests inaccurate. He has, however, also acknowledged that the samples had been carefully cleaned with strong chemicals before testing. He noted that different cleaning procedures were employed by and within the three laboratories, and that even if some slight contamination remained, about two thirds of the sample would need to consist of modern material to swing the result away from a 1st-century date to a medieval date. He inspected the Arizona sample material before it was cleaned, and determined that no such gross amount of contamination was present even before the cleaning commenced.

==== By reactive carbon ====
Others have suggested that the silver of the molten reliquary and the water used to douse the flames may have catalysed the airborne carbon into the cloth.

The Russian Dmitri Kouznetsov, an archaeological biologist and chemist, claimed in 1994 to have managed to experimentally reproduce this purported enrichment of the cloth in ancient weaves, and published numerous articles on the subject between 1994 and 1996.

Kouznetsov's results could not be replicated, and no actual experiments have been able to validate this theory, so far.

Jull, Donahue and Damon of the NSF Arizona Accelerator Mass Spectrometer Facility at the University of Arizona attempted to replicate the Kouznetsov experiment, and could find no evidence for the gross changes in age proposed by Kouznetsov et al. They concluded that the proposed carbon-enriching heat treatments were not capable of producing the claimed changes in the measured radiocarbon age of the linen, that the attacks by Kouznetsov et al. on the 1988 radiocarbon dating of the shroud "in general are unsubstantiated and incorrect," and that the "other aspects of the experiment are unverifiable and irreproducible."

Gian Marco Rinaldi and others proved that Kouznetsov never performed the experiments described in his papers, citing non-existent fonts and sources, including the museums from which he claimed to have obtained the samples of ancient weaves on which he performed the experiments.

Kouznetsov was arrested in 1997 on American soil under allegations of accepting bribes by magazine editors to produce manufactured evidence and false reports.

==== By carbon monoxide in smoke ====
In 2008, John Jackson of the Turin Shroud Center of Colorado proposed a new hypothesis – namely the possibility of more recent enrichment if carbon monoxide were to slowly interact with a fabric so as to deposit its enriched carbon into the fabric, interpenetrating into the fibrils that make up the cloth. Jackson proposed to test if this were actually possible. Christopher Ramsey, the director of the Oxford University Radiocarbon Accelerator Unit, took the theory seriously and agreed to collaborate with Jackson in testing a series of linen samples that could determine if the case for the Shroud's authenticity should be re-opened. Before conducting the tests, he told the BBC that "With the radiocarbon measurements and with all of the other evidence which we have about the Shroud, there does seem to be a conflict in the interpretation of the different evidence." Ramsey stressed that he would be surprised if the results of the 1988 tests were shown to be far out – especially "a thousand years wrong" – but he insisted that he was keeping an open mind.

The results of the tests were to form part of a documentary on the Turin Shroud which was to be broadcast on BBC2. The producer of the 2008 documentary, David Rolfe, suggested that the quantity of carbon 14 found on the weave may have been significantly affected by the weather, the conservation methods employed throughout the centuries, as well as the volatile carbon generated by the fire that damaged the shroud while in Savoy custody at Chambéry. Other similar theories include that candle smoke (rich in carbon dioxide) and the volatile carbon molecules produced during the two fires may have altered the carbon content of the cloth, rendering carbon-dating unreliable as a dating tool.

In March 2008, Ramsey reported back on the testing that: "So far the linen samples have been subjected to normal conditions (but with very high concentrations of carbon monoxide). These initial tests show no significant reaction – even though the sensitivity of the measurements is sufficient to detect contamination that would offset the age by less than a single year. This is to be expected and essentially confirms why this sort of contamination has not been considered a serious issue before." He noted that carbon monoxide does not undergo significant reactions with linen which could result in an incorporation of a significant number of CO molecules into the cellulose structure. He also added that there is as yet no direct evidence to suggest the original radiocarbon dates are not accurate.

In 2011, Ramsey commented that in general "there are various hypotheses as to why the dates might not be correct, but none of them stack up."

=== Response to restoration claims ===
The official report of the dating process, written by the people who performed the sampling, states that the sample "came from a single site on the main body of the shroud away from any patches or charred areas."

As part of the testing process in 1988, a Derbyshire laboratory in England assisted the University of Oxford radiocarbon acceleration unit by identifying foreign material removed from the samples before they were processed. Edward Thomas Hall of the Oxford team noticed two or three "minute" fibers which looked "out of place", and those "minute" fibers were identified as cotton by Peter South (textile expert of the Derbyshire laboratory) who said: "It may have been used for repairs at some time in the past, or simply became bound in when the linen fabric was woven. It may not have taken us long to identify the strange material, but it was unique amongst the many and varied jobs we undertake."

Mechthild Flury-Lemberg is an expert in the restoration of textiles, who headed the restoration and conservation of the Turin Shroud in 2002. She has rejected the theory of the "invisible reweaving", pointing out that it would be technically impossible to perform such a repair without leaving traces, and that she found no such traces in her study of the shroud.

H. E. Gove, former professor emeritus of physics at the University of Rochester and former director of the Nuclear Structure Research Laboratory at the University of Rochester, helped to invent radiocarbon dating and was closely involved in setting up the shroud dating project. He also attended the actual dating process at the University of Arizona. Gove has written (in the respected scientific journal Radiocarbon) that: "Another argument has been made that the part of the shroud from which the sample was cut had possibly become worn and threadbare from countless handlings and had been subjected to medieval textile restoration. If so, the restoration would have had to be done with such incredible virtuosity as to render it microscopically indistinguishable from the real thing. Even modern so-called invisible weaving can readily be detected under a microscope, so this possibility seems unlikely. It seems very convincing that what was measured in the laboratories was genuine cloth from the shroud after it had been subjected to rigorous cleaning procedures. Probably no sample for carbon dating has ever been subjected to such scrupulously careful examination and treatment, nor perhaps ever will again."

In December 2010, Timothy Jull, a member of the original 1988 radiocarbon-dating team and editor of the peer-reviewed journal Radiocarbon, coauthored an article in that journal with Rachel A Freer-Waters. They examined a portion of the radiocarbon sample that was left over from the section used by the University of Arizona in 1988 for the carbon dating exercise, and were assisted by the director of the Gloria F Ross Center for Tapestry Studies. They viewed the fragment using a low magnification (~30×) stereo microscope, as well as under high magnification (320×) viewed through both transmitted light and polarized light, and then with epifluorescence microscopy. They found "only low levels of contamination by a few cotton fibers" and no evidence that the samples actually used for measurements in the C14 dating processes were dyed, treated, or otherwise manipulated. They concluded that the radiocarbon dating had been performed on a sample of the original shroud material.

== Statistical analyses ==
In 1994, J. A. Christen applied a strong statistical test to the radiocarbon data and concluded that the given age for the shroud is, from a statistical point of view, correct. Critics claim to have identified statistical errors in the conclusions published in Nature, including the actual standard deviation for the Tucson study was 17 years, not 31, as published; the chi-square distribution value is 8.6 rather than 6.4, and the relative significance level (which measures the reliability of the results) is close to 1% rather than the published 5%, which is the minimum acceptable threshold. In 2010, statisticians Marco Riani and Anthony C. Atkinson wrote in a scientific paper that the statistical analysis of the raw dates obtained from the three laboratories for the radiocarbon test suggests the presence of contamination in some of the samples. They conclude: "The effect is not large over the sampled region; ... our estimate of the change is about two centuries."

In the 2010s and 2020s, several statistical analyses have been conducted on the radiocarbon dating data, attempting to draw some conclusions about the reliability of the C14 dating from studying the data rather than studying the shroud itself. They have all concluded that the data shows a lack of homogeneity, which might be due to unidentified abnormalities in the fabric tested, or else might be due to differences in the pre-testing cleaning processes used by the different laboratories. The most recent analysis (2020) concludes that the stated date range needs to be adjusted by up to 88 years in order to properly meet the requirement of "95% confidence". In a 2020 paper, pro-authenticity advocates Bryan Walsh and Larry Schwalbe stated in the discussion section as follows:

- "At this time, the source of the statistical heterogeneity of the Shroud data is unknown, but one of two broad hypotheses could reasonably account for the effect. One is that some differences may have existed in either the sample processing or measurement protocols of the different laboratories. The other is that some inherent variation was present in the carbon isotopic composition of the Shroud sample itself ..."
- "An alternate hypothesis is that some difference in residual contamination may have occurred as a result of differences in the individual laboratories' cleaning procedures ..."
- "In support of the contamination hypothesis, Fig. 4 illustrates how the mean results from the Zurich and Tucson data (open symbols) agree within their calculated experimental error (note level B-B′), whereas that from Oxford does not (A-A′). If the Zurich and Tucson data were displaced upward by 88 RCY as shown in the figure all of the results would agree within the uncertainty observed. Indeed, if the magnitude of the "adjustment" were as small as ~10 RCY, the χ2 analysis would confirm a statistical homogeneity assuming the uncertainties in the data did not change."

== Vanillin loss theory ==
Raymond Rogers argued in the scientific journal Thermochimica Acta that the presence of vanillin differed markedly between the unprovenanced threads he was looking at, which contained 37% of the original vanillin, while the body of the shroud contained 0% of the original vanillin. He stated that: "The fact that vanillin cannot be detected in the lignin on shroud fibers, Dead Sea Scrolls linen, and other very old linens indicate that the shroud is quite old. A determination of the kinetics of vanillin loss suggest the shroud is between 1300 and 3000 years old. Even allowing for errors in the measurements and assumptions about storage conditions, the cloth is unlikely to be as young as 840 years".

In a 2020 paper, pro-authenticity advocates Bryan Walsh and Larry Schwalbe stated of this test that "Rogers' method has limitations and his results have not yet been widely accepted." Rogers' analysis is also questioned by skeptics such as Joe Nickell, who reasons that the conclusions of the author, Raymond Rogers, result from "starting with the desired conclusion and working backward to the evidence".

== Claims of writing on the Shroud ==
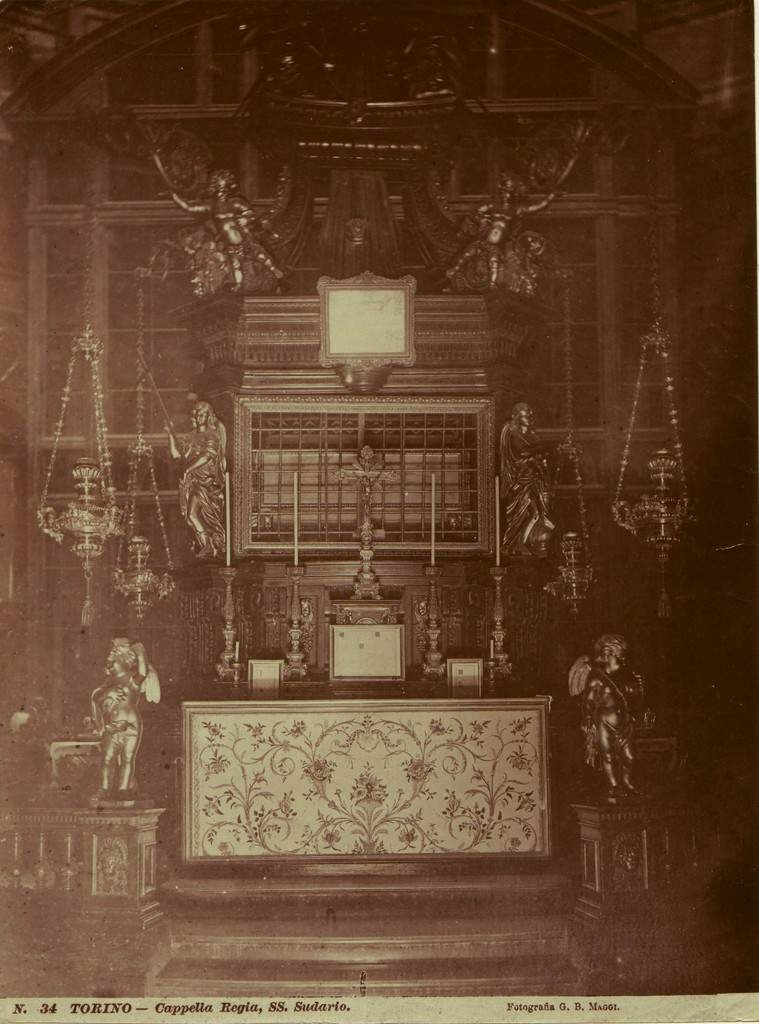
A late 19th-century photograph of the Chapel of the Holy Shroud

In 1979 Greek and Latin letters were reported as written near the face. These were further studied by André Marion, a professor at the École supérieure d'optique and his student Anne Laure Courage, in 1997. Subsequently, after performing computerized analysis and microdensitometer studies, they reported finding additional inscriptions, among them INNECEM (a shortened form of Latin "in necem ibis"—"you will go to death"), NNAZAPE(N)NUS (Nazarene), IHSOY (Jesus) and IC (Iesus Chrestus). The uncertain letters IBE(R?) have been conjectured as "Tiberius". Linguist Mark Guscin disputed the reports of Marion and Courage. He stated that the inscriptions made little grammatical or historical sense and that they did not appear on the slides that Marion and Courage indicated.

In 2009, Barbara Frale, a paleographer in the Vatican Secret Archives, who had published two books on the Shroud of Turin reported further analysis of the text. In her books Frale had stated that the shroud had been kept by the Templars after 1204. In 2009 Frale stated that it is possible to read on the image the burial certificate of Jesus the Nazarene, or Jesus of Nazareth, imprinted in fragments of Greek, Hebrew, and Latin writing.

Frale stated the text on the Shroud reads: "In the year 16 of the reign of the Emperor Tiberius Jesus the Nazarene, taken down in the early evening after having been condemned to death by a Roman judge because he was found guilty by a Hebrew authority, is hereby sent for burial with the obligation of being consigned to his family only after one full year." Since Tiberius became emperor after the death of Octavian Augustus in AD 14, the 16th year of his reign would be within the span of the years AD 30 to 31. Frale's methodology has been criticized, partly based on the objection that the writings are too faint to see. Dr Antonio Lombatti, an Italian historian, rejected the idea that the authorities would have bothered to tag the body of a crucified man. He stated that "It's all the result of imagination and computer software."

A study by Lorusso et al. subjected two photographs of the shroud to digital image processing, one of them being a reproduction of the photographic negative taken by Giuseppe Enrie in 1931. They did not find any signs, symbols or writing on either image, and noted that these signs may be linked to protuberances in the yarn, as well possibly as to the alteration and influence of the texture of the Enrie photographic negative during its development in 1931.

== Images of coins theory ==
Researchers Jackson, Jumper, and Stephenson report detecting the impressions of coins placed on both eyes after a digital study in 1978. They claimed to have seen a two-lepton coin on the right eyelid dating from 29 to 30, and a one-lepton coin on the left eyebrow minted in 29. The existence of the coin images is rejected by most scientists. A study published in 2011 by Lorusso and others subjected two photographs of the shroud to detailed modern digital image processing, one of them being a reproduction of the photographic negative taken by Giuseppe Enrie in 1931. They did not find any images of flowers or coins or any other additional objects on the shroud in either photograph, they noted that the faint images identified by the Whangers were "only visible by incrementing the photographic contrast", and they concluded that these signs may be linked to protuberances in the yarn, and possibly also to the alteration and influence of the texture of the Enrie photographic negative during its development in 1931. The use of coins to cover the eyes of the dead is not attested for 1st-century Judea.

== Pollens and images of flowers theory ==
In 1997 Avinoam Danin, a botanist at the Hebrew University of Jerusalem, reported that he had identified Chrysanthemum coronarium (now called Glebionis coronaria), Cistus creticus and Zygophyllum whose pressed image on the shroud was first noticed by Alan Whanger in 1985 on the photographs of the shroud taken in 1931. He reported that the outlines of the flowering plants would point to March or April and the environs of Jerusalem. In a separate report in 1978 Danin and Uri Baruch reported on the pollen grains on the cloth samples, stating that they were appropriate to the spring in Israel. Max Frei, a Swiss police criminologist who initially obtained pollen from the shroud during the STURP investigation, stated that of the 58 different types of pollens found, 45 were from the Jerusalem area, while six were from the eastern Middle East, with one pollen species growing exclusively in Istanbul, and two found in Edessa, Turkey. Mark Antonacci argues that the pollen evidence and flower images are inherently interwoven and strengthen each other.

In 2008 Avinoam Danin reported analysis based on the ultraviolet photographs of Miller and Pellicori taken in 1978. Danin reported five new species of flower, which also bloom in March and April and stated that a comparison of the 1931 black and white photographs and the 1978 ultraviolet images indicate that the flower images are genuine and not the artifact of a specific method of photography.

However Danin stated in 2011, that: "In 2001 we brought most of the slides to Prof. Dr. Thomas Litt who is an expert palynologist and has very sophisticated microscopic equipment. Prof. Litt concluded that none of the pollen grains he saw could be named at a species level. Hence, all the conclusions drawn from previous palynological investigations of Dr. Frei's material should be suspended until a new collection of pollen grains can be carried out and the grains thus obtained can be studied with modern equipment and by an expert of pollen of this area."

Skeptics have argued that the flower images are too faint for Danin's determination to be definite, that an independent review of the pollen strands showed that one strand out of the 26 provided contained significantly more pollen than the others, perhaps pointing to deliberate contamination. Skeptics also argue that Max Frei had previously been duped in his examination of the Hitler Diaries and that he may have also been duped in this case, or may have introduced the pollens himself. J. Beaulieau has stated that Frei was a self-taught amateur palynologist, was not properly trained, and that his sample was too small.

A study published in 2011 by professor Salvatore Lorusso of the University of Bologna and others subjected two photographs of the shroud to detailed modern digital image processing, one of them being a reproduction of the photographic negative taken by Giuseppe Enrie in 1931. They did not find any images of flowers or coins or anything else on either image, they noted that the faint images identified by the Whangers were "only visible by incrementing the photographic contrast", and they concluded that these signs may be linked to protuberances in the yarn, and possibly also to the alteration and influence of the texture of the Enrie photographic negative during its development in 1931.

In 2015, Italian researchers Barcaccia et al. published a new study in Scientific Reports. They examined the human and non-human DNA found when the shroud and its backing cloth were vacuumed in 1977 and 1988. They found traces of 19 different plant taxa, including plants native to Mediterranean countries, Central Europe, North Africa, the Middle East, Eastern Asia (China) and the Americas. Of the human mtDNA, sequences were found belonging to haplogroups that are typical of various ethnicities and geographic regions, including Europe, North and East Africa, the Middle East and India. A few non-plant and non-human sequences were also detected, including various birds and one ascribable to a marine worm common in the Northern Pacific Ocean, next to Canada. After sequencing some DNA of pollen and dust found on the shroud, they confirmed that many people from many different places came in contact with the shroud. According to the scientists, "such diversity does not exclude a Medieval origin in Europe but it would be also compatible with the historic path followed by the Turin Shroud during its presumed journey from the Near East. Furthermore, the results raise the possibility of an Indian manufacture of the linen cloth."

== 3D Imaging ==
In 1976 Pete Schumacher, John Jackson and Eric Jumper analysed a photograph of the shroud image using a VP8 Image Analyzer, which was developed for NASA to create brightness maps of the moon. A brightness map (isometric display) interprets differences of brightness within an image as differences of elevation—brighter patches are seen as being closer to the camera and darker patches as farther away. Our minds interpret these gradients as a "pseudo-three-dimensional image". They found that, unlike any photograph they had analyzed, the shroud image has the property of decoding into a 3-dimensional image, when the darker parts of the image are interpreted to be those features of the man that were closest to the shroud and the lighter areas of the image those features that were farthest. The researchers could not replicate the effect when they attempted to transfer similar images using techniques of block print, engravings, a hot statue, and bas-relief.

Optical physicist and former STURP member John Dee German has noted that it is not difficult to make a photograph which has 3D qualities. If the object being photographed is lighted from the front, and a non-reflective "fog" of some sort exists between the camera and the object, then less light will reach and reflect back from the portions of the object that are farther from the lens, thus creating a contrast which is dependent on distance.

== Energy source theories ==
Since 1930 several researchers (J. Jackson, G. Fanti, T. Trenn, T. Phillips, J.-B. Rinaudo and others) endorsed the flash-like irradiation hypothesis. It was suggested that the relatively high definition of the image details can be obtained through the energy source (specifically, protonic) acting from inside. The Russian researcher Alexander Belyakov proposed an intense, but short flashlight source, which lasted some hundredths of a second. Some other authors suggest the X-radiation or a burst of directional ultraviolet radiation may have played a role in the formation of the Shroud image.

=== Corona discharge ===
During restoration in 2002, the back of the cloth was photographed and scanned for the first time. Giulio Fanti, a scientist at the University of Padua, wrote an article on this subject with colleagues in 2005 that envisages electrostatic corona discharge as the probable mechanism to produce the images of the body in the Shroud. Congruent with that mechanism, they also describe an image on the reverse side of the fabric, much fainter than that on the front view of the body, consisting primarily of the face and perhaps hands. As with the front picture, it is entirely superficial, with coloration limited to the carbohydrate layer. The images correspond to, and are in registration with, those on the other side of the cloth. No image is detectable in the reverse side of the dorsal view of the body.

Raymond Rogers criticized the theory, saying: "It is clear that a corona discharge (plasma) in air will cause easily observable changes in a linen sample. No such effects can be observed in image fibers from the Shroud of Turin. Corona discharges and/or plasmas made no contribution to image formation."

In December 2011, Fanti published a critical compendium of the major hypotheses regarding the formation of the body image on the shroud. He stated that "none of them can completely explain the mysterious image". Fanti then considered corona discharge as the most probable hypothesis regarding the formation of the body image. He stated that it would be impossible to reproduce all the characteristics of the image in a laboratory because the energy source required would be too high. Fanti has restated the radiation theories in a 2013 book.

=== Ultraviolet radiation ===
In December 2011 scientists at Italy's National Agency for New Technologies, Energy and Sustainable Development ENEA deduced from the STURP results that the color of the Shroud image is the result of an accelerated aging process of the linen, similar to the yellowing of the paper of ancient books. They demonstrated that the photochemical reactions caused by exposing linen to ultraviolet light could reproduce the main characteristics of the Shroud image, such as the shallowness of the coloration and the gradient of the color, which are not reproducible by other means. When subsequently illuminated with a UV lamp, the irradiated linen fabrics behaved like the linen of the Shroud. They also determined that UV radiation changes the crystalline structure of cellulose in a similar manner as aging and long-duration background radiation.

Paolo Di Lazzaro, the lead researcher, indicated in an e-mail interview that "it appears unlikely a forger may have done this image with technologies available in the Middle Ages or earlier", but their study does not mean the Shroud image was created by the flash of a miraculous resurrection, contrary to how the story was presented in the media, especially on the internet. Professional skeptic and investigator Joe Nickell states that the latest findings are nothing new despite being "dressed up in high-tech tests", and that they don't prove much of anything.

== Burial ointments theory ==
In November 2011, F. Curciarello et al. published a paper that analyzed the abrupt changes in the yellowed fibril density values on the Shroud image. They concluded that the rapid changes in the body image intensity are not anomalies in the manufacturing process of the linen but that they can be explained with the presence of aromas or burial ointments. However, their work leaves the existence of an energy source for the image an open question.

== Other theories ==
Other theories have been proposed as well, such as the nuclear emissions theory which claims that the image was formed from nuclear emissions from an earthquake that struck Jerusalem in 33 AD.

== Fringe dating ==
There has been some fringe dating of the Shroud using methods that are unvalidated by the broader scientific and archaeological communities. According to a 2022 study by Italian researchers De Caro et al., who invented a new technique involving X-rays to date the material threads:

The experimental results are compatible with the hypothesis that the TS is a 2000-year-old relic, as supposed by Christian tradition, under the condition that it was kept at suitable levels of average secular temperature — 20.0–22.5 °C — and correlated relative humidity — 75–55% — for 13 centuries of unknown history, in addition to the seven centuries of known history in Europe. To make the present result compatible with that of the 1988 radiocarbon test, the TS should have been conserved during its hypothetical seven centuries of life at a secular room temperature very close to the maximum values registered on the earth.

Previously, a 2018 paper on the Shroud co-authored by De Caro and his colleagues that used wide-angle X-ray scattering alongside transmission electron microscopy, was retracted by the journal PLOS One and from the host on PubMed, because not only did their study lack sufficient controls to support their conclusions, but the provenance of the fibers used in the analysis was also questioned. The WAXS dating was also covered by Andrea Nicolotti who noted that from 2014 to 2022 the same pair of researchers Giulio Fanti and Liberato De Caro introduced four separate non-standard dating methods, and he urged caution regarding the reliability of their claims and origin of the unverified minute (0.5 mm × 1 mm) sample. Nicolotti would additionally highlight potential ideological conflicts of interest, as the creators of these protocols are known "sindonologists"—individuals who study the Shroud of Turin from an already believing perspective, and actively seek to prove its authenticity. In 2025, Karapanagiotis analysed experimental studies claimed to challenge the 1989 radiocarbon dating, which included the indirect X-ray method of De Caro et al., but found them to be insufficient. The author suggested that extracting new material, and performing a second series of radiocarbon dating would be the next necessary logical step.

== See also ==
- Conservation-restoration of the Shroud of Turin
- Fringe science
- History of the Shroud of Turin
- Image of Edessa
- List of cognitive biases
- Manoppello Image
- Occam's razor
- Philosophy of science
- Pseudoscience
- Scientific method
- Scientific skepticism
- Veil of Veronica
