= Radiocarbon dating of the Shroud of Turin =

The Shroud of Turin, a linen cloth that tradition associates with the crucifixion and burial of Jesus, has undergone numerous scientific tests, the most notable of which is radiocarbon dating, in an attempt to determine the relic's authenticity. In 1988, scientists at three separate laboratories dated samples from the Shroud to a range of 1260–1390 AD, which coincides with the first certain appearance of the shroud in the 1350s and is much later than the burial of Jesus in 30 or 33 AD. Aspects of the 1988 test continue to be debated, with the various attempts to overturn the radiocarbon results being unsuccessful.

Despite some technical concerns that have been raised about radiocarbon dating of the Shroud, no radiocarbon-dating expert has asserted that the dating is substantially unreliable, and the laboratories continue to support the results. In 2019, an editor of Nature (the journal in which the radiocarbon dating study was published) stated that "Nothing published so far on the shroud...offers compelling reason to think that the 1989 study was substantially wrong—but apparently it was not definitive either." The papal authorities have since 1989 been unwilling to release samples for scientific study.

== Background ==
=== 1978: the creation of the Shroud of Turin Research Project ===
The idea of scientifically dating the shroud had first been proposed in the 1960s, but permission had been refused because the procedure at the time would have required the destruction of too much fabric (almost 0.05 sq m ≅ 0.5 sq ft). The development in the 1970s of new techniques for radio-carbon dating, which required much smaller quantities of source material, prompted the Roman Catholic Church to found the Shroud of Turin Research Project (STURP), which involved about 30 scientists of various religious faiths, including non-Christians.

The STURP group initially planned to conduct a range of different studies on the cloth, including radio-carbon dating. A commission headed by chemist Robert H. Dinegar and physicist Harry E. Gove consulted numerous laboratories which were able at the time (1982) to carbon-date small fabric samples. The six labs that showed interest in performing the procedure fell into two categories, according to the method they utilised:

- Two used a proportional counter approach:
  - Brookhaven National Laboratory, Upton, New York, United States;
  - Atomic Energy Research Establishment, Harwell, Oxfordshire, England;
- Four used accelerator mass spectrometry:
  - Nuclear Structure Research Laboratory, University of Rochester, Rochester, New York, United States;
  - the University of Oxford, England;
  - University of Arizona, Tucson, Arizona, United States;
  - ETH Zürich, Switzerland.

To obtain independent and replicable results, and to avoid conflict between the laboratories, it was decided to let all interested laboratories perform the tests at the same time.

=== Disagreements between STURP and candidate laboratories ===
In 1982, the STURP group published the list of tests to be performed on the shroud; these aimed to identify how the image was impressed onto the cloth, to verify the relic's purported origin, and to identify better-suited conservation methods. However, a disagreement between the STURP group and the candidate laboratories turned into a public relations rift: the STURP group expected to perform the radiometric examination under its own aegis and after the other examinations had been completed, while the laboratories considered radio-carbon dating to be the prime test, which should be completed at the detriment of other tests, if necessary.

=== The 1986 Turin protocol ===
A meeting with ecclesiastic authorities took place on September 29, 1986, to determine the way forward. In the end, a compromise solution was reached with the so-called "Turin protocol", which stated that:

- carbon-dating would be the only test performed;
- original and control samples, indistinguishable from each other, would be provided (blind test);
- the test would be performed concurrently by seven laboratories, under the joint supervision of the Pontifical Academy of Science, the Archbishop of Turin, and the British Museum;
- both dating methods would be adopted;
- the sample offered to each laboratory would weigh 28 mg, in total equivalent to 9 cm^{2} of cloth;
- the British Museum would manage the distribution of the samples;
- laboratories would not communicate with each other during the analysis, nor divulge the results of the tests to anyone but the three supervising authorities.

The Vatican subsequently decided to adopt a different protocol instead.

- On April 27, 1987, a Vatican spokesperson announced to the newspaper La Stampa that the procedure would probably be performed by two or three laboratories at most;
- On October 10, Cardinal Anastasio Ballestrero officially announced to the seven laboratories that the proportional counter method would not be used because this method would require too much Shroud material (gram quantities rather than milligram quantities). Only three laboratories, namely Oxford, Tucson, and Zürich, would be provided with Shroud samples to be tested.
- The sole supervising institution would be the British Museum, headed by Michael Tite.

These deviations were heavily criticized.

The blind-test method was abandoned, because the distinctive three-to-one herringbone twill weave of the shroud could not be matched in the controls, and it was therefore still possible for a laboratory to identify the shroud sample. Shredding the samples would not solve the problem, while making it much more difficult and wasteful to clean the samples properly. Harry Gove, director of Rochester's laboratory (one of the four not selected by the Vatican), argued in an open letter published in Nature that discarding the blind-test method would expose the results – whatever they may be – to suspicion of unreliability. However, in a 1990 paper Gove conceded that the "arguments often raised, … that radiocarbon measurements on the shroud should be performed blind seem to the author to be lacking in merit; … lack of blindness in the measurements is a rather insubstantial reason for disbelieving the result."

In the heated debate that followed, Church spokesperson Luigi Gonella declared that

[T]he Church must respond to the challenge of those who want it to stop the process, who would want us to show that the Church fears the science. We are faced with actual blackmail: unless we accept the conditions imposed by the laboratories, they will start a marketing campaign of accusations against the Church, which they will portray as scared of the truth and enemy of science. ... The pressure on the ecclesiastic authorities to accept the Turin protocol have almost approached illegality.

=== The final protocol ===
The proposed changes to the Turin protocol sparked another heated debate among scientists, and the sampling procedure was postponed.

On April 17, 1988, ten years after the STURP had been initiated, British Museum scientific director Michael Tite published in Nature the "final" protocol:

- the laboratories at Oxford, Zürich, and Tucson would perform the test;
- they would each receive one sample weighing 40 mg, sampled from a single portion of weave;
- the laboratories would each receive two control samples, clearly distinguishable from the shroud sample;
- samples would be delivered to the laboratories' representatives in Turin;
- each test would be filmed;
- there would be no comparison of results (nor communication) between laboratories until the results be certified as definitive, univocal, and complete;
- the proportional counter method would not be used because it required gram quantities rather than milligram quantities of the shroud material.

Among the most obvious differences between the final version of the protocol and the previous ones stands the decision to sample from a single location on the cloth. This is significant because, should the chosen portion be in any way not representative of the remainder of the shroud, the results would only be applicable to that portion of the cloth.

A further, relevant difference was the deletion of the blind test, considered by some scholars as the very foundation of the scientific method. The blind-test method was abandoned because the distinctive three-to-one herringbone twill weave of the shroud could not be matched in the controls, and a laboratory could thus identify the shroud sample. Shredding the samples would not solve the problem, while making it much more difficult and wasteful to clean the samples properly.

== Testing process ==
=== Sampling ===
Samples were taken on April 21, 1988, in the Cathedral by Franco Testore, an expert on weaves and fabrics, and by Giovanni Riggi, a representative of the maker of bio-equipment "Numana". Testore performed the weighting operations while Riggi made the actual cut. Also present were Cardinal Ballestrero, four priests, archdiocese spokesperson Luigi Gonella, photographers, a camera operator, Michael Tite of the British Museum, and the labs' representatives.

As a precautionary measure, a piece twice as big as the one required by the protocol was cut from the Shroud; it measured 81 mm × 21 mm (3.19 in × 0.83 in). An outer strip showing coloured filaments of uncertain origin was discarded. The remaining sample, measuring 81 mm × 16 mm (3.19 in × 0.63 in) and weighing 300 mg, was first divided in two equal parts, one of which was preserved in a sealed container, in the custody of the Vatican, in case of future need. The other half was cut into three segments, and packaged for the labs in a separate room by Tite and the archbishop. The lab representatives were not present at this packaging process, in accordance with the protocol.

The labs were also each given three control samples (one more than originally intended), that were:

- a fragment of weave coming from an Egyptian burial, discovered in 1964 and already carbon-dated to 1100;
- a piece of mummy bandage carbon-dated to 200;
- a sample of the cloak having belonged to Louis IX of France and preserved in Saint-Maximin, Var, France, which had a verifiable provenance and was woven between 1240 and 1270.

=== Completion of tests ===
Tucson performed the tests in May, Zürich in June, and Oxford in August, and communicated their results to the British Museum.

On September 28, 1988, British Museum director and coordinator of the study Michael Tite communicated the official results to the Diocese of Turin and to the Holy See.

=== Official announcement ===
In a well-attended press conference on October 13, Cardinal Ballestrero announced the official results, i.e. that radio-carbon testing dated the shroud to a date of 1260–1390, with 95% confidence. The official and complete report on the experiment was published in Nature. The uncalibrated dates from the individual laboratories, with 1 standard deviation errors (68% confidence), were as follows:

- Tucson: 646 ± 31 years;
- Oxford: 750 ± 30 years;
- Zürich: 676 ± 24 years old;
- the unweighted mean was "691 ± 31 years", which corresponds to calibrated ages of "1273–1288" with 68% confidence, and "1262–1312, 1353–1384 CE cal" with 95% confidence.

As reported in Nature, Anthos Bray of the Instituto di Metrologia 'G. Colonetti', Turin, "confirmed that the results of the three laboratories were mutually compatible, and that, on the evidence submitted, none of the mean results was questionable."

== Criticisms of the test results ==
=== Medieval repairs ===
Although the quality of the radiocarbon testing itself is not questioned by experts, criticisms have been raised regarding the choice of the sample taken for testing, with suggestions that the sample may represent a medieval repair fragment rather than the image-bearing cloth. It is hypothesised that the sampled area was a medieval repair which was conducted by "invisible reweaving". Since the C14 dating, at least four articles have been published in scholarly sources contending that the samples used for the dating test may not have been representative of the whole shroud.

These included an article by American chemist Raymond Rogers, Director of Chemical Research for the Shroud of Turin Research Project (STURP), who was involved in work with the Shroud since STURP began in 1978. Rogers took 32 documented adhesive-tape samples from all areas of the shroud and associated textiles during the STURP process in 1978. He received 14 yarn segments from Luigi Gonella (from the Department of Physics at the Polytechnic University of Turin) on 14 October 1979, which Gonella told him were from a sample removed by Gilbert Raes of the Ghent Institute of Textile Technology in 1973. On 12 December 2003, Rogers received samples of both warp and weft threads that Luigi Gonella claimed to have taken from the radiocarbon sample before it was distributed for dating. The actual provenance of these threads is uncertain, as Gonella was not authorized to take or retain genuine shroud material, but Gonella told Rogers that he excised the threads from the center of the radiocarbon sample.

Raymond Rogers stated in a 2005 article that he performed chemical analyses on these undocumented threads, and compared them to the undocumented Raes threads as well as the samples he had kept from his STURP work. He stated that his analysis showed: "The radiocarbon sample contains both a gum/dye/mordant coating and cotton fibers. The main part of the shroud does not contain these materials." He speculated that these products may have been used by medieval weavers to match the colour of the original weave when performing repairs and backing the shroud for additional protection. Based on this comparison Rogers concluded that the undocumented threads received from Gonella did not match the main body of the shroud, and that in his opinion: "The worst possible sample for carbon dating was taken."

As part of the testing process in 1988, Derbyshire laboratory in the UK assisted the Oxford University radiocarbon acceleration unit by identifying foreign material removed from the samples before they were processed. Edward Hall of the Oxford team noticed two or three "minute" fibers which looked "out of place", and those "minute" fibers were identified as cotton by Peter South (textile expert of the Derbyshire laboratory) who said: "It may have been used for repairs at some time in the past, or simply became bound in when the linen fabric was woven. It may not have taken us long to identify the strange material, but it was unique amongst the many and varied jobs we undertake."

The official report of the dating process, written by the people who performed the sampling, states that the sample "came from a single site on the main body of the shroud away from any patches or charred areas."

Mechthild Flury-Lemberg is an expert in the restoration of textiles, who headed the restoration and conservation of the Turin Shroud in 2002. She has rejected the theory of the "invisible reweaving", pointing out that it would be technically impossible to perform such a repair without leaving traces, and that she found no such traces in her study of the shroud.

Harry E. Gove helped to invent radiocarbon dating and was closely involved in setting up the shroud dating project. He also attended the actual dating process at the University of Arizona. Gove has written (in the respected scientific journal Radiocarbon) that: "Another argument has been made that the part of the shroud from which the sample was cut had possibly become worn and threadbare from countless handlings and had been subjected to medieval textile restoration. If so, the restoration would have had to be done with such incredible virtuosity as to render it microscopically indistinguishable from the real thing. Even modern so-called invisible weaving can readily be detected under a microscope, so this possibility seems unlikely. It seems very convincing that what was measured in the laboratories was genuine cloth from the shroud after it had been subjected to rigorous cleaning procedures. Probably no sample for carbon dating has ever been subjected to such scrupulously careful examination and treatment, nor perhaps ever will again."

In 2010, statisticians Marco Riani and Anthony C. Atkinson wrote in a scientific paper that the statistical analysis of the raw dates obtained from the three laboratories for the radiocarbon test suggests the presence of contamination in some of the samples. They conclude that: "The effect is not large over the sampled region; … our estimate of the change is about two centuries."

In December 2010, Timothy Jull, a member of the original 1988 radiocarbon-dating team and editor of the peer-reviewed journal Radiocarbon, coauthored an article in that journal with Rachel A. Freer-Waters. They examined a portion of the radiocarbon sample that was left over from the section used by the University of Arizona in 1988 for the carbon-dating exercise, and were assisted by the director of the Gloria F. Ross Center for Tapestry Studies. They viewed the fragment using a low magnification (~30×) stereomicroscope, as well as under high magnification (320×) viewed through both transmitted light and polarized light, and then with epifluorescence microscopy. They found "only low levels of contamination by a few cotton fibers" and no evidence that the samples actually used for measurements in the C14 dating processes were dyed, treated, or otherwise manipulated. They concluded that the radiocarbon dating had been performed on a sample of the original shroud material. In another study in 2026, the same authors discovered that there was no signs of repairs or contamination, and the C14 dating was done on pieces of the original fabric.

In March 2013, Giulio Fanti, professor of mechanical and thermal measurement at the University of Padua, conducted a battery of experiments on various threads that he believes were cut from the shroud during the 1988 carbon-14 dating, and concluded that they dated from 300 BC to 400 CE, potentially placing the Shroud within the lifetime of Jesus of Nazareth. Because of the manner in which Fanti obtained the shroud fibers, many are dubious about his findings. The shroud's official custodian, Archbishop Cesare Nosiglia of Turin, told Vatican Insider: "As there is no degree of safety on the authenticity of the materials on which these experiments were carried out [on] the shroud cloth, the shroud's custodians cannot recognize any serious value to the results of these alleged experiments." Barrie Schwortz, a member of the original STURP investigation team, commented on Fanti's theory: "But it would be more convincing if the basic research had first been presented in a professional, peer-reviewed journal. If you're using old techniques in new ways, then you need to submit your approach to other scientists."

=== Contrasting evidence ===
Raymond Rogers argued in the scientific journal Thermochimica Acta that the presence of vanillin differed markedly between the unprovenanced threads he was looking at, which contained 37% of the original vanillin, while the body of the shroud contained 0% of the original vanillin. He stated that: "The fact that vanillin cannot be detected in the lignin on shroud fibers, Dead Sea scrolls linen, and other very old linens indicate that the shroud is quite old. A determination of the kinetics of vanillin loss suggest the shroud is between 1300 and 3000 years old. Even allowing for errors in the measurements and assumptions about storage conditions, the cloth is unlikely to be as young as 840 years".

It has been stated that Roger's vanillin-dating process is untested, and the validity thereof is suspect, as the deterioration of vanillin is heavily influenced by the temperature of its environment – heat strips away vanillin rapidly, and the shroud has been subjected to temperatures high enough to melt silver and scorch the cloth.

=== Contamination by bacteria ===
Pictorial evidence dating from c. 1690 and 1842 indicates that the corner used for the dating and several similar evenly spaced areas along one edge of the cloth were handled each time the cloth was displayed, the traditional method being for it to be held suspended by a row of five bishops. Others contend that repeated handling of this kind greatly increased the likelihood of contamination by bacteria and bacterial residue compared to the newly discovered archaeological specimens for which carbon-14 dating was developed. Bacteria and associated residue (bacteria by-products and dead bacteria) carry additional carbon-14 that would skew the radiocarbon date toward the present.

Rodger Sparks, a radiocarbon expert from New Zealand, had countered that an error of thirteen centuries stemming from bacterial contamination in the Middle Ages would have required a layer approximately doubling the sample weight. Because such material could be easily detected, fibers from the shroud were examined at the National Science Foundation Mass Spectrometry Center of Excellence at the University of Nebraska. Pyrolysis-mass-spectrometry examination failed to detect any form of bioplastic polymer on fibers from either non-image or image areas of the shroud. Additionally, laser-microprobe Raman analysis at Instruments SA, Inc. in Metuchen, New Jersey, also failed to detect any bioplastic polymer on shroud fibers.

Harry Gove once hypothesised that a "bioplastic" bacterial contamination, which was unknown during the 1988 testing, could have rendered the tests inaccurate. He has however also acknowledged that the samples had been carefully cleaned with strong chemicals before testing. He noted that different cleaning procedures were employed by and within the three laboratories, and that even if some slight contamination remained, about two thirds of the sample would need to consist of modern material to swing the result away from a 1st-century date to a medieval date. He inspected the Arizona sample material before it was cleaned, and determined that no such gross amount of contamination was present even before the cleaning commenced.

=== Contamination by reactive carbon ===
Others have suggested that the silver of the molten reliquary and the water used to douse the flames may have catalysed the airborne carbon into the cloth. The Russian Dmitri Kouznetsov, an archaeological biologist and chemist, claimed in 1994 to have managed to experimentally reproduce this purported enrichment of the cloth in ancient weaves, and published numerous articles on the subject between 1994 and 1996. Kouznetsov's results could not be replicated, and no actual experiments have been able to validate this theory, so far. Gian Marco Rinaldi and others proved that Kouznetsov never performed the experiments described in his papers, citing non-existent fonts and sources, including the museums from which he claimed to have obtained the samples of ancient weaves on which he performed the experiments. Kouznetsov was arrested in 1997 on American soil under allegations of accepting bribes by magazine editors to produce manufactured evidence and false reports.

Jull, Donahue and Damon of the NSF Arizona Accelerator Mass Spectrometer Facility at the University of Arizona attempted to replicate the Kouznetsov experiment, and could find no evidence for the gross changes in age proposed by Kouznetsov et al. They concluded that the proposed carbon-enriching heat treatments were not capable of producing the claimed changes in the measured radiocarbon age of the linen, that the attacks by Kouznetsov et al. on the 1988 radiocarbon dating of the shroud "in general are unsubstantiated and incorrect," and that the "other aspects of the experiment are unverifiable and irreproducible."

=== Contamination by smoke ===
In 2008, John Jackson of the Turin Shroud Center of Colorado proposed a new hypothesis – namely the possibility of more recent enrichment if carbon monoxide were to slowly interact with a fabric so as to deposit its enriched carbon into the fabric, interpenetrating into the fibrils that make up the cloth. Jackson proposed to test if this were actually possible. Christopher Ramsey, the director of the Oxford University Radiocarbon Accelerator Unit, took the theory seriously and agreed to collaborate with Jackson in testing a series of linen samples that could determine if the case for the Shroud's authenticity should be re-opened. Before conducting the tests, he told the BBC that "With the radiocarbon measurements and with all of the other evidence which we have about the Shroud, there does seem to be a conflict in the interpretation of the different evidence." Ramsey stressed that he would be surprised if the results of the 1988 tests were shown to be far out – especially "a thousand years wrong" – but he insisted that he was keeping an open mind.

The results of the tests were to form part of a documentary on the Turin Shroud which was to be broadcast on BBC2. The producer of the 2008 documentary, David Rolfe, suggested that the quantity of carbon-14 found on the weave may have been significantly affected by the weather, the conservation methods employed throughout the centuries, as well as the volatile carbon generated by the fire that damaged the shroud while in Savoy custody at Chambéry. Other similar theories include that candle smoke (rich in carbon dioxide) and the volatile carbon molecules produced during the two fires may have altered the carbon content of the cloth, rendering carbon dating unreliable as a dating tool.

In March 2008 Ramsey reported back on the testing that: "So far the linen samples have been subjected to normal conditions (but with very high concentrations of carbon monoxide). These initial tests show no significant reaction – even though the sensitivity of the measurements is sufficient to detect contamination that would offset the age by less than a single year. This is to be expected and essentially confirms why this sort of contamination has not been considered a serious issue before." He noted that carbon monoxide does not undergo significant reactions with linen which could result in an incorporation of a significant number of CO molecules into the cellulose structure. He also added that there is as yet no direct evidence to suggest the original radiocarbon dates are not accurate.

In 2011, Ramsey commented that in general "there are various hypotheses as to why the dates might not be correct, but none of them stack up."

=== Accuracy ===
In 1994, J. A. Christen applied a robust statistical test to the radiocarbon data and concluded that the given age for the shroud is, from a statistical point of view, correct.

In recent years several statistical analyses have been conducted on the radiocarbon dating data, attempting to draw some conclusions about the reliability of the C14 dating from studying the data rather than studying the shroud itself. They have all concluded that the data shows a lack of homogeneity; in particular, the measurements fail the Ward & Wilson χ² test (the same statistical procedure cited in the Nature article to justify combining the inter-laboratory results). This might be due to unidentified abnormalities in the fabric tested, or else might be due to differences in the pre-testing cleaning processes used by the different laboratories. Specifically:

- A 2013 paper by Riani et al. stated that "The twelve results from the 1988 radio carbon dating of the Shroud of Turin show surprising heterogeneity." They also stated that "Our results indicate that, for whatever reasons, the structure of the TS is more complicated than that of the three fabrics with which it was compared." The same paper's regression analysis concluded, without presenting any evidence, that although the University of Arizona laboratory received two subsamples (A1 and A2), it measured only A1. The authors reported that Prof. Timothy Jull of Arizona later confirmed via personal communication that only A1 had been analyzed. In a 2020 article the same authors noted this fact was "surprising, because [the Nature article] did not report that only three samples out of four were dated in 1988. Everybody took it for granted that the dating was the result of the C14 counts of four samples."
- A 2019 paper by Casabianca et al., using British Museum documentation released in 2017, reported discrepancies between “raw” laboratory values supplied to the British Museum and the values published in Nature; for example, they noted that one Zürich measurement (their fifth observation) is 595 ± 46 in the raw documentation but 679 ± 51 in Nature. The authors also stated that: "A statistical analysis of the Nature article and the raw data strongly suggests that homogeneity is lacking in the data and that the procedure should be reconsidered." They further stated that: "Our statistical results do not imply that the medieval hypothesis of the age of the tested sample should be ruled out." They went on to conclude that: "The measurements made by the three laboratories on the TS sample suffer from a lack of precision which seriously affects the reliability of the 95% CE 1260–1390 interval. The statistical analyses, supported by the foreign material found by the laboratories, show the necessity of a new radiocarbon dating to compute a new reliable interval. … Without this re-analysis, it is not possible to affirm that the 1988 radiocarbon dating offers 'conclusive evidence' that the calendar age range is accurate and representative of the whole cloth."
- In a 2020 paper, Bryan Walsh and Larry Schwalbe reanalyzed the 1988 radiocarbon measurements and reported that, while data from three control samples showed no heterogeneity, the Shroud sample measurements were statistically heterogeneous. They wrote that this finding would "preclude the step of combining the individual data sets and reporting the mean date as was done." The authors further stated that the original report "did not follow the W–W recommendation to reconsider the data," and that the heterogeneity "should, at the very least, have prompted a strong qualification to the reported final result."

Walsh and Schwalbe considered two hypotheses to explain the heterogeneity. The first hypothesis is that the carbon isotopic composition varies by location on the cloth; in support of this hypothesis, they reported an approximate linear dependence of the dates on the sample locations. The second hypothesis is that differences in the cleaning protocols used by the three laboratories resulted in different levels of residual contamination. In support of this hypothesis, they noted that "If the Zurich and Tucson data were displaced upward by 88 [radio-carbon years] ... all of the results would agree within the uncertainty observed," and added that even an adjustment as small as ~10 radiocarbon years would restore statistical homogeneity. The authors cautioned that "The cause for an offset ... is a matter of speculation," and proposed further experimental (including non-destructive) testing of the retained Arizona subsample to evaluate the competing hypotheses.

Philip Ball, a former editor of the science journal Nature, wrote in 2019 that "Casabianca and colleagues don’t assert that their analysis shows the shroud to be much older...Nothing published so far on the shroud, including this paper, offers compelling reason to think that the 1989 study was substantially wrong—but apparently it was not definitive either." He also commented that he has never seen persuasive evidence that the shroud comes from the time of Jesus, and it was time for additional tests using modern technology, but the reticence on behalf of the Vatican may indicate a fear of what further studies might reveal.

== See also ==
- Conservation of the Shroud of Turin
- Fringe theories about the Shroud of Turin
- History of the Shroud of Turin
