= PMC =

PMC may refer to:

== Computing ==
- Pacific Microelectronics Centre, acquired by Sierra Semiconductor in 1994 to form PMC-Sierra
- Parallel model combination, a hidden Markov model-based method for speech recognition
- PCI Mezzanine Card, a form factor for computer circuit boards
- Polymorphic containers, a feature of the Parrot virtual machine
- Portable Media Center, a hard drive-based portable media player
- Programmable metallization cell, new memory technology that uses copper nanowires
- Power management controller

== Education ==
- Pine Manor College, Massachusetts, United States
- Plymouth College, United Kingdom
- Poonch Medical College, Azad Kashmir, Pakistan
- Punjab Medical College, now Faisalabad Medical University, Pakistan

== Hospitals ==
- Palomar Medical Center, California, United States
- Parrish Medical Center, Florida, United States

== Military ==
- Philippine Marine Corps
- Popular Mobilization Forces (Iraq)
- Private military companies (PMCs)
  - Private military contractors – personnel of the company
- President of the Mess Committee
- Portuguese Marine Corps

== Municipal corporations ==
- Patna Municipal Corporation
- Porto Municipal Chamber
- Potato Marketing Corporation of Western Australia
- Pune Municipal Corporation
- Panvel Municipal Corporation

== Organizations and businesses ==
- Paleozoological Museum of China
- PMC Ltd., the Professional Monitor Company Limited, a British loudspeaker manufacturer

== Places ==
- El Tepual Airport (IATA: PMC, ICAO: SCTE), Chile
- Palais de la musique et des congrès, a music and convention venue in France
- Pine Mountain Club, California, United States

== Publishing and entertainment ==
- Panjabi MC (born 1971), British hip hop DJ
- Penske Media Corporation, a publishing company, abbreviated PMC
- Persian Music Channel, a TV network
- PMC Ltd. (Professional Monitor Company), a manufacturer of loudspeakers
- PMC: The Bunker, native title of the South Korean film Take Point

== Science and medicine ==
- Paramyotonia congenita, a genetic disorder
- Percent modern carbon (pMC), a relative unit used for the calculation of radiocarbon dates
- PhysMath Central, a defunct journal imprint
- Polar mesospheric clouds, also known as noctilucent clouds, a weather phenomenon
- Pontine micturition center, part of the brainstem
- Posteromedial cortex, the rear (posterior) portion of the centerline (medial) face of the cerebral cortex
- Premotor cortex, part of the cerebral cortex
- Pseudomembranous colitis, a disease of the colon
- PubMed Central, a collection of journal articles

== Politics and sociology ==
- Politico-media complex, a name given to the network of relationships between a state's political classes and its media industry
- Professional–managerial class, a social class within capitalism.

== Other uses ==
- Pakistan Medical Commission, a statutory regulatory authority for medical and dental practitioners
- Pan-Mass Challenge, a charity bike-a-thon
- Passenger Movement Charge, a tax payable by passengers departing Australia
- Permanent Mandates Commission, a commission of the League of Nations
- Philippine Marine Corps, part of the Philippine Navy
- Philsaga Mining Corporation, a Philippine gold mining company
- Polymer matrix composite, a composite material
- Population Media Center, an organization headquartered in Vermont, United States
- Precious Metal Clay, a brand of metal clay
- Presidential Memorial Certificate, United States
- Pressed Metal Corporation, an Australian automotive manufacturer
- Private Medical Conference of an astronaut of the ISS in flight with a doctor on the ground
- Project management committee
- Punjab & Maharashtra Co-operative Bank
- Pyeonghwa Motors Corp., a car manufacturer in North Korea
- Pearl Milling Company, a brand commonly known for pancake/waffle mix and maple syrup

== See also ==
- PMCS (disambiguation)
