= Conservation-restoration of the Shroud of Turin =

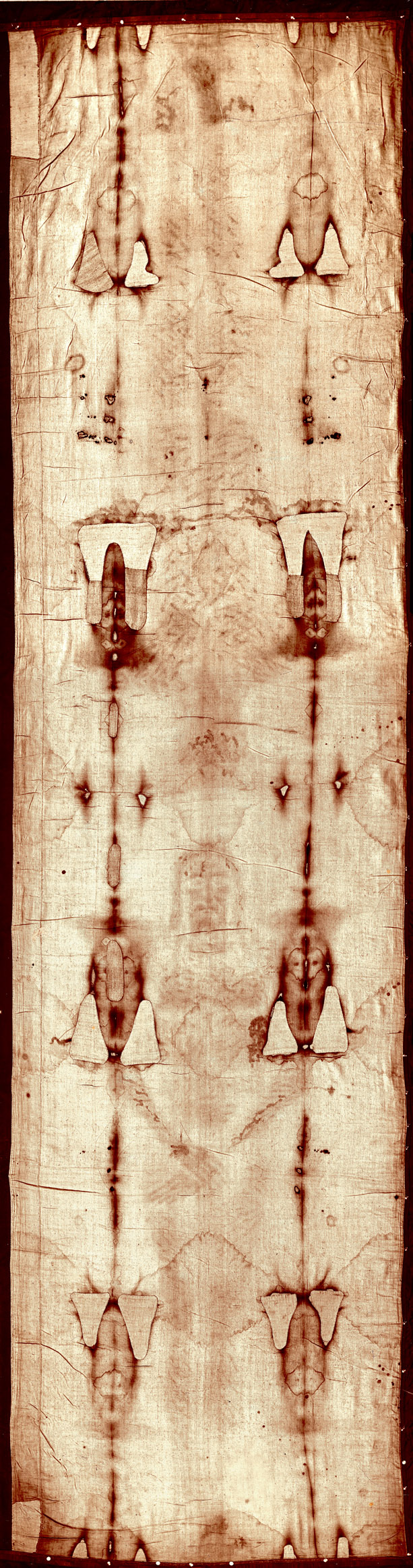
The Shroud of Turin in 1931

During its history, the Shroud of Turin has been subjected to repairs and restoration, such as after the fire which damaged it in 1532. Since 1578 the Shroud has been kept in the Royal Chapel of Turin Cathedral (from 1694 to 1993 the Shroud rested in the Royal Chapel's Bertola altar). Currently it is stored under the laminated bulletproof glass of an airtight case, filled with chemically-neutral gasses. The temperature and humidity controlled-case is filled with argon (99.5%) and oxygen (0.5%) to prevent chemical changes. The Shroud itself is kept on an aluminum support sliding on runners and stored flat within the case.

== Public showings ==
When the Shroud is not on public display, the case is closed; during the public display the case can be moved, raised and opened. During the last centuries, the Shroud has been publicly exhibited a limited number of times, often on very special occasions.

=== 18th century ===
- 4 May 1722
- 4 May 1737: to celebrate the marriage of Charles Emmanuel III, Duke of Savoy and King of Sardinia.
- 29 June 1750: to celebrate the marriage of Victor Amadeus III, then Prince of Sardinia
- 15 October 1775: to celebrate the marriage of Charles Emmanuel IV, then Prince of Sardinia

=== 19th century ===
- 20 May 1814: to celebrate the return of Victor Emmanuel I, King of Sardinia, to Turin
- 21 May 1815: requested by Pope Pius VII to mark the restoration of the Papal States
- 4 January 1822: to celebrate the accession of Charles Felix, King of Sardinia
- 4 May 1842: to celebrate the marriage of Victor Emmanuel II, then Duke of Savoy
- 24–27 April 1868: to celebrate the marriage of Umberto I, King of Italy
- 25 May–2 June 1898: to commemorate the 400th anniversary of the Turin Cathedral and 50th anniversary of Italy's Statuto Albertino constitution. Secondo Pia took the first photograph of the Shroud.

=== 20th century ===
- 3–24 May 1931: to celebrate the marriage of Umberto II, then Prince of Piedmont. The Shroud is photographed for the second time (by Giuseppe Enrie)
- 24 September–15 October 1933: requested by Pope Pius XI to mark the 19th centenary of the Resurrection
- 26 August–8 October 1978: to commemorate the fourth centenary of Turin's custody of the Shroud
- 18 April–14 June 1998: to commemorate the centenary of the first photograph of the Shroud by Secondo Pia
- 12 August–22 October 2000: to commemorate the Jubilee anniversary of the birth of Jesus

=== 21st century ===
- 10–23 May 2010: first public exhibition of the Shroud after its restoration in 2002
- 19 April–24 June 2015: to commemorate the bicentenary of the birth of John Bosco
- 8–12 August 2018: in preparation for the Synod on Young People

== Restorations ==
On 4 December 1532, the Shroud sustained a fire, which burned several holes in the fabric. In the spring of 1534, the Poor Clare Nuns patched the holes and placed a backing Holland cloth on the reverse.

On 11 April 1997, the Turin Cathedral sustained another fire, but the Shroud survived entirely unscathed. By that time the Shroud was being held within three walls of plate glass, each 11 feet (3.4 m) long and 6.5 feet (2.0 m) high. The fireman Mario Trematore decided to use a sledgehammer against the bulletproof glass to rescue the relic. Eventually he caused the 39mm thick material to shatter and another fireman arrived to help Trematore. When asked how he managed to break the glass, Trematore replied: "The bulletproof glass can stop bullets, but it cannot stop the strength of values represented by the symbol inside it. With only a hammer and our hands (still bleeding), we broke the glass".

During the 2002 restoration, conducted by the Commission for the Conservation of the Shroud between 20 June and 22 July, thirty triangular patches, sewn by nuns in 1534, as well as the Holland cloth, were removed. The 2002 restoration has been criticized as causing damage to the Shroud.

== Natural hazards ==
Because of dehydration, which might have been involved in the image formation, the Shroud was not recommended to be stored in vacuum. As the minor changes of temperature can enhance the pressure, humidity and mechanical stress, the Shroud's case was made climate-controlled.

An electron microscope investigation of the dust and pollens removed from the Shroud during the 1978 examination has revealed that some species of mites are resident on the cloth. Lichenothelia and arachnids in one of the tape samples have been also observed.

As the Shroud was rolled and unrolled for display throughout the centuries, it sustained a repeated abrasion of the charred edges to the areas holed in the fire. The low magnification images of the blood areas already show an extensive abrasion of this type. To reduce the stress of gravity the Shroud was suggested being in horizontal display. To minimize possible cosmic ray exposure, it was also suggested that the plane of the cloth be aligned perpendicular to the ground.

American researcher Alan D. Adler, confirming the presence of bilirubin on the fabric, noted that it is not light-stable and may change the color under any light. According to Adler, since the image fibers are at or near saturation while the surrounding cloth is not, the latter will gradually get darker until the image first becomes a silhouette and later finally vanishes.

== See also ==
- Fringe theories about the Shroud of Turin
- History of the Shroud of Turin
- Radiocarbon dating of the Shroud of Turin
