= Meteoritics & Planetary Science =

- Discipline: Planetary science
- Language: English
- Edited by: A.J. Timothy Jull

Publication details
- Former name(s): Meteoritics
- History: 1953-present
- Publisher: Wiley-Blackwell on behalf of the Meteoritical Society
- Frequency: Monthly
- Open access: Hybrid
- Impact factor: 2.40 (2024)

Standard abbreviations
- ISO 4: Meteorit. Planet. Sci.

Indexing
- ISSN: 1086-9379 (print); 1945-5100 (web)
- LCCN: 96655038
- OCLC no.: 34046030

Links
- Journal homepage; Journal page at publisher's website; Online access

Meteoritics & Planetary Science is a monthly peer-reviewed scientific journal published by Wiley-Blackwell on behalf of the Meteoritical Society. It specialises in the fields of meteoritics and planetary science.

The journal was established as Meteoritics in 1953, adopting its current name when the scope was broadened in 1996. Since January 1, 2003, the editor-in-chief is A.J. Timothy Jull (Arizona Accelerator Mass Spectrometry Laboratory).

== History ==
The journal was established in 1953 as the successor of the Notes and Contributions that were published on behalf of the Meteoritical Society in Popular Astronomy, from 1933 to 1951. Initially titled Meteoritics, with the 1996 January issue the journal became Meteoritics and Planetary Science.

== Scope ==
Coverage encompasses planets, natural satellites, interplanetary dust, interstellar medium, lunar samples, meteors, meteorites, asteroids, comets, craters, and tektites and comes from multiple disciplines, such as astronomy, astrophysics, physics, geophysics, chemistry, isotope geochemistry, mineralogy, Earth science, geology, or biology

The journal publishes original research papers, invited reviews, editorials, and book reviews.

== Abstracting and indexing ==
Meteoritics & Planetary Science is indexed and abstracted in:

- Current Contents/Physical, Chemical & Earth Sciences
- GEOBASE/Geographical & Geological Abstracts
- Meteorological & Geoastrophysical Abstracts
- Science Citation Index
- Scopus

According to the Journal Citation Reports, the journal has a 2019 impact factor of 2.863, ranking it 37h out of 85 journals in the category "Geochemistry & Geophysics".
