= PMCS =

PMCS or PMCs may refer to:

== Military ==
- Preventive maintenance checks and services
- Private military companies

== Other uses ==
- Paper Mario: Color Splash, a 2016 video game for the Wii U
- Polar mesospheric clouds, in the upper atmosphere
- Post micturition convulsion syndrome, in urology

== See also ==
- PMC (disambiguation)
