= Presidential Memorial Certificate =

- Created: March 1962; 63 years ago
- Signatories: President of the United States

A Presidential Memorial Certificate (PMC) is an engraved paper certificate, signed by the current President of the United States, to honor the memory of honorably discharged deceased veterans.

The program was initiated in March 1962 by President John F. Kennedy and has been continued by all subsequent Presidents. Statutory authority for the program is Section 112, Title 38, of the United States Code.

== Administer ==
The Department of Veterans Affairs (VA) administers the PMC program by preparing the certificates which bear the current President's signature expressing the country's grateful recognition of the veteran's service in the United States Armed Forces. Eligible recipients include the next of kin and loved ones of honorably discharged deceased veterans. More than one certificate may be provided.
