= Raymond Rogers =

American chemist

Raymond N. Rogers (July 21, 1927 – March 8, 2005) was an American chemist who was considered a leading expert in thermal analysis. To the general public, however, he was best known for his work on the Shroud of Turin.

== Biography ==
Rogers was born in Albuquerque, New Mexico. At the University of Arizona he studied chemistry, receiving a BS in 1950. From 1951 to 1988 he was an explosives research expert and thermal analyst with the Los Alamos Scientific Laboratory (later called Los Alamos National Laboratory or LANL). From 1987 until 1992 he served on the Department of the Air Force Scientific Advisory Board with the equivalent rank of Lt. General and received a Distinguished Service Award. He received other awards and recognitions from LANL and many professional organizations. He was granted a sabbatical in 1968 to pursue post-graduate studies in archaeology.

During his career Rogers published over forty peer-reviewed papers on chemistry. In 1981 he was named Laboratory Fellow at Los Alamos National Laboratory. Other honors included being named a Tour Speaker for the American Chemical Society in 1971, the Los Alamos National Laboratory Distinguished Performance Award in 1984, and the Department of the Air Force Exceptional Civilian Service Medal in 1991. He also served as the editor for Energetic Materials, a peer-reviewed scientific journal, from 1983-1988. He was also on the editorial board of Thermochimica Acta from the first issue of this journal in 1970 (also the very first paper published in the first issue of this journal is authored by him) until his retirement in 1988.

Rogers suffered from cancer. He died at his Los Alamos home on March 8, 2005. He was outlived by his wife, Joan, and his children.

== Shroud of Turin ==
Rogers was appointed Director of Chemical Research for the Shroud of Turin Research Project (STURP) in 1978, applying thermal methods to the study of this relic. In recent years, he further researched material relevant to the dating of the Shroud, publishing his findings in Thermochimica Acta.

In 1978, the team of scientists conducted their testing over five days in Turin, Italy.

Until Rogers's death in 2005, he continued to study the Shroud and explain the studies he had undertaken. He participated in ongoing discussions with the Shroud Science Group, a group of about 100 scientists, historians, and archeologists who continue to study the Shroud of Turin.

=== Criticism of the radiocarbon-14 dating of the Shroud of Turin ===
Rogers's continual study of the Shroud resulted from a 2000 study by Joseph Marino and Sue Benford, based on x-ray analysis of the sample sites, showing a probable seam from a repair attempt running diagonally through the area from which the sample was taken. These researchers conclude that the samples tested by the three labs were more or less contaminated by this repair attempt. They further note that the results of the three labs show an angular skewing corresponding to the diagonal seam: the first sample in Arizona dated to 1238 A.D., the second to 1430 A.D., with the Oxford and Swiss results falling in between. They add that the variance of the C-14 results of the three labs falls outside the bounds of the Pearson's chi-square test, so that some additional explanation should be sought for the discrepancy. The claims by Marino and Benford on the lack of statistical consistency of the results of the 1988 radiocarbon test were in contrast with the conclusions of J.A. Christen, who in 1994 applied robust statistics (Empirical Bayes method) to the radiocarbon data and concluded that the given age for the Shroud was correct, from a statistical point of view.

When Rogers saw the paper by Marino and Benford, his reaction was that they were not scientists, their theory was ridiculous, and that he still had fiber samples he had taken from the Shroud that could disprove their theory. Upon examining the fibers under a microscope, however, he concluded that, as they had hypothesized, a cotton patch had been woven into the linen fibers and then dyed to match the color of the linen. This was possible because linen is strongly resistant to dyes but cotton is not. Rogers claimed that the repair had gone undetected because it was expertly done; there was no record of it; none of the STURP team were textile experts; and the area had not previously been a major focus of any major Shroud researchers' attention, because it was outside the image area.

Rogers claimed that under the microscope he could see the undyed linen fibers, the cotton fibers, and the dye on the cotton fibers. Because he knew he had terminal cancer, he contacted his friend and fellow STURP researcher Barrie Schwortz to record interviews, etc. He also sent some of the fibers to a research lab for independent examination. When they were preparing samples, in one case they accidentally pulled apart the cotton and linen sections of one fiber. Schwortz reexamined false-color x-ray fluorescent photographs of the Shroud taken by STURP and pointed out that the sample for radiocarbon dating was taken from the only section that showed up green, indicating it had different chemical properties from the rest of the Shroud, but no one had previously paid attention to the color difference because the green portion is from a section that does not contain part of the image. In December 2008, the Discovery Channel in the United States presented a documentary titled Unwrapping the Shroud: New Evidence, containing a detailed explanation of the repair and footage of Schwortz and of Rogers discussing their new findings. A few months before his death, Rogers submitted an article describing his findings to a peer-reviewed journal, and it was published less than two months before Raymond Rogers died. The essential conclusion of the article is that the radiocarbon datings were accurate, but because the samples were from cloth that was not part of the original Shroud, they are irrelevant to the age of the image area.

=== Hypothesis on image origin (Maillard reaction) ===
The Maillard reaction is a form of non-enzymatic browning involving an amino acid and a reducing sugar. The cellulose fibers of the shroud are coated with a thin carbohydrate layer of starch fractions, various sugars, and other impurities.

Raymond N. Rogers and Anna Arnoldi, in a joint paper of 2003 proposed that amines from a recently deceased human body may have undergone Maillard reactions with this carbohydrate layer within a reasonable period of time, before liquid decomposition products stained or damaged the cloth. The gases produced by a dead body are extremely reactive chemically, and within a few hours (in an environment such as a tomb) a body starts to produce heavier amines, such as putrescine and cadaverine, in its tissues.

== See also ==
- Los Alamos Scientific Laboratory
- STURP
- Radiocarbon 14 dating of the Shroud of Turin
- Maillard reaction

== Bibliography ==
- A Chemist's Perspective On The Shroud of Turin by Raymond N. Rogers, 2008 ISBN 978-0-615-23928-6
