= John Beldon Scott =

American art historian

John Beldon Scott is an American art historian, Elizabeth M. Stanley Professor of the Arts and Director of the School of Art & Art History at the University of Iowa.

== Education ==
Scott received his B.A. from Indiana University (1968) and spent four years in the Air Force (1969–1973) before receiving his M.A. and Ph.D. degrees from Rutgers University (1975, 1982). He also spent a year pursuing graduate work in history at the University of California, Santa Barbara. His field of teaching and research is the art and architecture of early modern Italy.

== Works and research ==
His publications include: Images of Nepotism: The Painted Ceilings of Palazzo Barberini (Princeton, 1991) and Architecture for the Shroud: Relic and Ritual in Turin (Chicago, 2003). He has also co-authored The University of Iowa Guide to Campus Architecture (Iowa City, 2006). His articles have appeared in The Art Bulletin, The Burlington Magazine, Memoirs of the American Academy in Rome, Storia dell’Arte, Journal of the Warburg and Courtauld Institutes, and Journal of the Society of Architectural Historians.

His interests include studies of Borromini, Guarini, Pietro da Cortona, Annibale Carracci, Bernini, the patronage of the Barberini family, and urbanism in early modern Turin. Scott is preparing a study of urbanism and ritual in totalitarian regimes.

== Methodology ==
Scott is interested in the meaning of art in a historical context, especially in its political, social, and economic manifestations. Along with historical and social circumstances, he tries to make sense of the image by intently studying the iconography of the image along with its visual properties.

Erwin Panofsky, Ernst Gombrich, and Francis Haskell were strong formative influences. Scott's earliest publications, including his first book, Images of Nepotism make this influence apparent. Later in his career, patronage and audience begin to be of concern, but social history is still his dominant methodological bias. Scott, like many art historians, is committed to the essential role of archival research and the relentless visual analysis of the image; this strength for visual analysis is especially apparent in his work.

== Honors ==
Scott has been a fellow at the American Academy in Rome, the National Humanities Center, the Institute for Advanced Study, and the Stanford Humanities Center. He has served on the board of directors of the Society of Architectural Historians (1997–2000). He was also a member of the Institute for Advanced Study in Princeton. The book, Architecture for the Shroud: Relic and Ritual in Turin was awarded the 2004 College Art Association Charles Rufus Morey Prize.
