= A.J. Timothy Jull =

A.J. Timothy Jull (born 18 December 1951) is a radiocarbon scientist at the University of Arizona's Accelerator Mass Spectrometer Laboratory, as well as Editor in Chief of Meteoritics & Planetary Science and Radiocarbon: An International Journal of Cosmogenic Isotope Research. Dr. Jull's work spans numerous disciplines, from radiocarbon dating the Shroud of Turin, to looking for signs of life in Martian meteorites.

== Early life and career ==
Dr. Jull was born in Leeds, England. He graduated from the University of Bristol in 1976 with a PhD in geochemistry, doing postdoctoral work at Cambridge and the Max Planck Institute. Jull earned the Kirk Bryan Award in 1997 for his contributions in geological studies of Yellowstone National Park. He remains a senior research scientist and professor with the department of geosciences at the University of Arizona.

== Selected publications ==
1. Jull, A.J. Timothy, Donahue, Douglas J., Broshi, Magen, and Tov, Emmanuel. 1995. "Radiocarbon Dating of Scrolls and Linen Fragments from the Judean Desert." Radiocarbon 37 (1): 11–19.
2. Damon, P. E.; D. J. Donahue, B. H. Gore, A. L. Hatheway, A. J. T. Jull, T. W. Linick, P. J. Sercel, L. J. Toolin, C. R. Bronk, E. T. Hall, R. E. M. Hedges, R. Housley, I. A. Law, C. Perry, G. Bonani, S. Trumbore, W. Woelfli, J. C. Ambers, S. G. E. Bowman, M. N. Leese, M. S. Tite (1989-02). "Radiocarbon dating of the Shroud of Turin". Nature 337
3. R.A. Freer-Waters, A.J.T. Jull, Investigating a Dated piece of the Shroud of Turin, Radiocarbon, 52, 2010, pp. 1521–1527.
4. Burney, David A.; Burney, Lida Pigott; Godfrey, Laurie R.; Jungers, William L.; Goodman, Steven M.; Wright, Henry T.; Jull, A. J. Timothy (2004). "A chronology for late prehistoric Madagascar". Journal of Human Evolution 47 (1-2): 25–63. doi:10.1016/j.jhevol.2004.05.005. PMID 15288523.
5. Al-Bashaireh, Khaled, Abdulla al-Shorman, J.C. Rose, A.J. Timothy Jull, and Gregory Hodgins 2010 Paleodiet reconstruction of human remains from the archaeological site of Natfieh, northern Jordan. Radiocarbon 52 (2-3):645-652.
6. Al-Bashaireh, Khaled, Abdulla al-Shorman, J.C. Rose, and A.J. Timothy Jull 2011 Chronological reconstruction of Natfieh tombs, northern Jordan. Palestine Exploration Quarterly 143 (1): 1-14.
7. Grant A. Meyer, Stephen G. Wells, and A.J. Timothy Jull, Fire and alluvial chronology in Yellowstone National Park: climatic and intrinsic controls on Holocene geomorphic process: Geological Society of America Bulletin, v. 107, p. 1211-1230, 1995.
