= Calculation of radiocarbon dates =

Method to determine the age of an object

The calculation of radiocarbon dates determines the age of an object containing organic material by using the properties of radiocarbon (also known as carbon-14), a radioactive isotope of carbon.

Radiocarbon dating methods produce data based on the ratios of different carbon isotopes in a sample that must then be further manipulated in order to calculate a resulting "radiocarbon age". Radiocarbon dating is also referred to as carbon dating or carbon-14 dating. Calculations of radiocarbon dates are typically made based on measurements from beta counting devices or from accelerator mass spectrometers (AMS). There are several possible sources of error in both the beta counting and AMS methods.

There has been considerable confusion and lack of consistency in the names and symbols used in these calculations over the years.

== Calculations ==
The calculations to be performed depend on the measurements taken based on the technology used, since beta counters measure the sample's radioactivity, whereas accelerator mass spectrometers (AMS) determine the ratio of the three different carbon isotopes in the sample.

=== Standards ===
The calculations to convert measured data to an estimate of the age of the sample require the use of several standards. One of these, the standard for normalizing δ^{13}C values, is Pee Dee Belemnite (PDB), a fossil which has a ^{13}C/^{12}C ratio of 1.12372%. δ^{13}C for some sample is then calculated by dividing the amount of ^{13}C by 1.12372% and then subtracting 1 and multiplying by 1000 to give a value in "per mil". A related standard is the use of a δ^{13}C of -25 ‰, corresponding to wood, as the value used in normalization. Since different materials have different δ^{13}C values, it is possible for two samples of different materials, of the same age, to have different levels of radioactivity and different ^{14}C/^{12}C ratios. To compensate for this, the measurements are converted to the activity, or isotope ratio, that would have been measured if the sample had had a δ^{13}C of -25‰. This is possible because the δ^{13}C of the sample material can be measured, or taken from a table of typical values. The details of the calculations for beta counting and AMS are given below.

Another standard is the use of 1950 as "present", in the sense that a calculation that shows that a sample's likely age is 500 years "before present" means that it is likely to have come from about the year 1450. This convention is necessary in order to keep published radiocarbon results comparable to each other; without this convention, a given radiocarbon result would be of no use unless the year it was measured was also known—an age of 500 years published in 2010 would indicate a likely sample date of 1510, for example. In order to allow measurements to be converted to the 1950 baseline, a standard activity level is defined for the radioactivity of wood in 1950. Because the use of fossil fuels lowered the amount of ^{14}C in the atmosphere in the first half of the twentieth century, this is not actually the activity level of wood from 1950; the activity would have been somewhat lower. Therefore the fossil fuel effect was eliminated in fixing the standard value by measuring wood from 1890, and using the radioactive decay equations to determine what the activity would have been at the year of growth. The resulting standard value, A_{abs}, is 226 becquerels per kilogram of carbon. Activity levels, after being normalized to δ^{13}C of -25‰, can be divided by this in order to calculate the "radiocarbon age".

But as part of their methodology both beta counting and AMS measure standard samples containing carbon of a known activity, and the activity of the sample is divided by the activity of the standard. The first standard, Oxalic Acid SRM 4990B, also referred to as HOxI, was a 1,000 lb batch of oxalic acid prepared in 1955 by the National Bureau of Standards (NBS). Since it was produced after the start of nuclear weapon testing it incorporates carbon-14 produced by neutrons in the atmosphere, so the activity is higher than the desired standard, and this oxalic acid, having been produce from beets, had a δ^{13}C value of -19.3‰. These factors are addressed by defining the standard to be 0.95 times the activity of HOxI.

All of this first standard has long since been consumed, and later standards have been prepared, each of which has a given ratio to the desired standard activity. A secondary standard, Oxalic Acid SRM 4990C, also referred to as HOxII, 1,000 lb of which was prepared by NIST in 1977 from French beet harvests, is now in wide use.

=== Calculations for beta counting devices ===
To determine the age of a sample whose activity has been measured by beta counting, the ratio of its activity to the activity of the standard must be found. The equation:

$$A_s = A_{std} \left ( \frac{M_s - M_b}{M_{std} - M_b} \right )$$

gives the required ratio, where A_{s} is the true activity of the sample, A_{std} is the true activity of the standard, M_{s} is the measured activity of the sample, M_{std} is the measured activity of the standard, and M_{b} is the measured activity of the blank.

A correction must also be made for fractionation. The fractionation correction converts the ^{14}C/^{12}C ratio for the sample to the ratio it would have had if the material was wood, which has a δ^{13}C value of -25‰. This is necessary because determining the age of the sample requires a comparison of the amount of ^{14}C in the sample with what it would have had if it newly formed from the biosphere. The standard used for modern carbon is wood, with a baseline date of 1950.

Correcting for fractionation changes the activity measured in the sample to the activity it would have if it were wood of the same age as the sample. The calculation requires the definition of a ^{13}C fractionation factor, which is defined for any sample material as

$$\ce{Frac}_\ce{13/12 (sample)} = \frac {\left(\frac\ce{^{13}C}\ce{^{12}C}\right)_\ce{wood}}{\left(\frac\ce{^{13}C}\ce{^{12}C}\right)_\ce{sample}}$$

The ^{14}C fractionation factor, Frac_{14/12}, is approximately the square of this, to an accuracy of 1‰:

$$\text{Frac}_\text{14/12 (sample)} = (\text{Frac}_\text{13/12 (sample)})^2$$

Multiplying the measured activity for the sample by the ^{14}C fractionation factor converts it to the activity that it would have had had the sample been wood:

$$A_{sn} = A_s\text{Frac}_{14/12(s)}$$

where A_{sn} is the normalized activity for the sample, and Frac_{14/12 (s)} is the ^{14}C fractionation factor for the sample.

The equation for δ13C given earlier can be rearranged to

$$\left ( \frac \ce{^{13}C}\ce{^{12}C} \right )_\ce{sample} = \left ( 1 + \frac \ce{\delta^{13}C}{1000} \right ) \left ( \frac \ce{^{13}C}\ce{^{12}C} \right )_\ce{PDB}$$

Substituting this in the ^{14}C fractionation factor, and also substituting the value for δ13C for wood of -25‰, gives the following expression:

$$A_{sn} = A_s \left ( \frac {\left (1 - \frac {25}{1000} \right )\left ( \frac \ce{^{13}C}\ce{^{12}C} \right )_\ce{PDB}}{\left (1 + \frac \ce{\delta^{13}C}{1000} \right )\left ( \frac \ce{^{13}C}\ce{^{12}C} \right )_\ce{PDB}} \right )^2$$

where the δ13C value remaining in the equation is the value for the sample itself. This can be measured directly, or simply looked up in a table of characteristic values for the type of sample material—this latter approach leads to increased uncertainty in the result, as there is a range of possible δ13C values for each possible sample material. Cancelling the PDB ^{13}C/^{12}C ratio reduces this to:

$$A_{sn} = A_s \left ( \frac {\left (1 - \frac {25}{1000} \right )}{\left (1 + \frac \ce{\delta^{13}C}{1000} \right )} \right )^2$$

Once $A_{sn}$ has been calculated, it can be divided by a similarly calculated value for the standard (with appropriate multiplying factor) or by $A_{abs}$ to obtain the ratio needed to obtain the "radiocarbon age".

=== AMS calculations ===
The results from AMS testing are in the form of ratios of ^{12}C, ^{13}C, and ^{14}C. These ratios are used to calculate F_{m}, the "fraction modern", defined as

$$F_m = \frac{R_{norm}}{R_{modern}}$$

where R_{norm} is the ^{14}C/^{12}C ratio for the sample, after correcting for fractionation, and R_{modern} is the standard ^{14}C/^{12}C ratio for modern carbon.

The calculation begins by subtracting the ratio measured for the machine blank from the other sample measurements. That is:

$$R'_s = R_s - R_{mb}$$

$$R'_{std} = R_{std} - R_{mb}$$

$$R'_{pb} = R_{pb} - R_{mb}$$

where R_{s} is the measured sample ^{14}C/^{12}C ratio; R_{std} is the measured ratio for the standard; R_{pb} is the measured ratio for the process blank, and R_{mb} is the measured ratio for the machine blank. The next step, to correct for fractionation, can be done using either the ^{14}C/^{12}C ratio or the ^{14}C/^{13}C ratio, and also depends on which of the two possible standards was measured: HOxI or HoxII. R'_{std} is then R'_{HOxI} or R'_{HOxII}, depending on which standard was used. The four possible equations are as follows. First, if the ^{14}C/^{12}C ratio is used to perform the fractionation correction, the following two equations apply, one for each standard.

$$R_\ce{HOxI,-19} = R'_\ce{HoxI}\left ( \frac {1 + \frac {-19} {1000}} {1 + \frac \ce{\delta^{13}C_{HoXI}} {1000}}\right )^2$$

$$R_\ce{HOxII,-25} = R'_\ce{HoxII}\left ( \frac {1 + \frac {-25} {1000}} {1 + \frac \ce{\delta^{13}C_{HoXII}} {1000}} \right )^2$$

If the ^{14}C/^{13}C ratio is used instead, then the equations for each standard are:

$$R_\ce{HOxI,-19} = R'_\ce{HoxI}\left ( \frac {1 + \frac {-19} {1000}} {1 + \frac \ce{\delta^{13}C_{HoXI}} {1000}} \right )$$

$$R_\ce{HOxII,-25} = R'_\ce{HoxII}\left ( \frac {1 + \frac {-25} {1000}} {1 + \frac \ce{\delta^{13}C_{HoXII}} {1000}} \right )$$

The δ13C values in the equations measure the fractionation in the standards as CO_{2}, prior to their conversion to graphite to use as a target in the spectrometer. This assumes that the conversion to graphite does not introduce significant additional fractionation.

Once the appropriate value above has been calculated, R_{modern} can be determined; it is

$$R_{modern} = 0.95R_\text{HOxI,-19} = .7459R_\text{HOxII,-25}$$

The values 0.95 and 0.7459 are part of the definition of the two standards; they convert the ^{14}C/^{12}C ratio in the standards to the ratio that modern carbon would have had in 1950 if there had been no fossil fuel effect.

Since it is common practice to measure the standards repeatedly during an AMS run, alternating the standard target with the sample being measured, there are multiple measurements available for the standard, and these measurements provide a couple of options in the calculation of R_{modern}. Different labs use this data in different ways; some simply average the values, while others consider the measurements made on the standard target as a series, and interpolate the readings that would have been measured during the sample run, if the standard had been measured at that time instead.

Next, the uncorrected fraction modern is calculated; "uncorrected" means that this intermediate value does not include the fractionation correction.

$$Fm_{uc} = \frac {R'_s} {R_{modern}}$$

Now the measured fraction modern can be determined, by correcting for fractionation. As above there are two equations, depending on whether the ^{14}C/^{12}C or ^{14}C/^{13}C ratio is being used. If the ^{14}C/^{12}C ratio is being used:

$$Fm_{ms} = Fm_{uc}\left ( \frac {1 + \frac {-25} {1000}} {1 + \frac {\ce{\delta^{13}C}_s} {1000}} \right )^2$$

If the ^{14}C/^{13}C ratio is being used:

$$Fm_{ms} = Fm_{uc}\left ( \frac {1 + \frac {-25} {1000}} {1 + \frac {\ce{\delta^{13}C}_s} {1000}} \right )$$

The δ13C_{s} value is from the sample itself, measured on CO_{2} prepared while converting the sample to graphite.

The final step is to adjust Fm_{ms} for the measured fraction modern of the process blank, Fm_{pb}, which is calculated as above for the sample. One approach (Note: McNichol & Burr give two other calculations, one of which can be shown to be equivalent to the one given here. The other depends on the process blank being the same mass as the sample.) is to determine the mass of the measured carbon, C_{ms}, along with C_{pb}, the mass of the process blank, and C_{s}, the mass of the sample. The final fraction modern, Fm_{s} is then

$$Fm_s = \frac {Fm_{ms}\ce{C}_{ms} - Fm_{pb}\ce{C}_{pb}} {\ce{C}_s}$$

The fraction modern is then converted to an age in "radiocarbon years", meaning that the calculation uses Libby's half-life of 5,568 years, not the more accurate modern value of 5,730 years, and that no calibration has been done:

$$\text{Radiocarbon age} = -8033 \ln (Fm)$$

=== Errors and reliability ===
There are several possible sources of error in both the beta counting and AMS methods, although laboratories vary in how they report errors. All laboratories report counting statistics—that is, statistics showing possible errors in counting the decay events or number of atoms—with an error term of 1σ (i.e. 68% confidence that the true value is within the given range). These errors can be reduced by extending the counting duration: for example, testing a modern benzene sample will find about eight decay events per minute per gram of benzene, and 250 minutes of counting will suffice to give an error of ± 80 years, with 68% confidence. If the benzene sample contains carbon that is about 5,730 years old (the half-life of ^{14}C), then there will only be half as many decay events per minute, but the same error term of 80 years could be obtained by doubling the counting time to 500 minutes. Note that the error term is not symmetric, though the effect is negligible for recent samples; for a sample with an estimated age of 30,600 years, the error term might be +1600 to -1300.

To be completely accurate, the error term quoted for the reported radiocarbon age should incorporate counting errors not only from the sample, but also from counting decay events for the reference sample, and for blanks. It should also incorporate errors on every measurement taken as part of the dating method, including, for example, the δ13C term for the sample, or any laboratory conditions being corrected for such as temperature or voltage. These errors should then be mathematically combined to give an overall term for the error in the reported age, but in practice laboratories differ, not only in the terms they choose to include in their error calculations, but also in the way they combine errors. The resulting 1σ estimates have been shown to typically underestimate the true error, and it has even been suggested that doubling the given 1σ error term results in a more accurate value.

The usual presentation of a radiocarbon date, as a specific date plus or minus an error term, obscures the fact that the true age of the object being measured may lie outside the range of dates quoted. In 1970, the British Museum radiocarbon laboratory ran weekly measurements on the same sample for six months. The results varied widely (though consistently with a normal distribution of errors in the measurements), and included multiple date ranges (of 1σ confidence) that did not overlap with each other. The extreme measurements included one with a maximum age of under 4,400 years, and another with a minimum age of over 4,500 years.

It is also possible for laboratories to have systematic errors, caused by weaknesses in their methodologies. For example, if 1% of the benzene in a modern reference sample is allowed to evaporate, scintillation counting will give a radiocarbon age that is too young by about 80 years. Laboratories work to detect these errors both by testing their own procedures, and by periodic inter-laboratory comparisons of a variety of different samples; any laboratories whose results differ from the consensus radiocarbon age by too great an amount may be suffering from systematic errors. Even if the systematic errors are not corrected, the laboratory can estimate the magnitude of the effect and include this in the published error estimates for their results.

The limit of measurability is approximately eight half-lives, or about 45,000 years. Samples older than this will typically be reported as having an infinite age. Some techniques have been developed to extend the range of dating further into the past, including isotopic enrichment, or large samples and very high precision counters. These methods have in some cases increased the maximum age that can be reported for a sample to 60,000 and even 75,000 years.

=== Comparing and combining determinations ===
In many applications, multiple radiocarbon determinations are obtained either from the same object or from several samples believed to represent the same event or archaeological context. Because a single determination may be affected not only by counting error but also by additional laboratory and environmental uncertainties, formal statistical procedures are required to assess whether such results are mutually consistent and, if so, whether they may be combined into a more precise pooled estimate.

Ward and Wilson (1978) provided a systematic statistical framework for comparing and combining determinations, distinguishing between two fundamental situations:

- Case I – Multiple determinations are made on the same object, or on subsamples of the same object (for example, laboratory inter-comparisons). In this case, all measurements are assumed to estimate a single true age, and differences between determinations arise from independent measurement errors.
- Case II – Determinations are made on different objects that are hypothesized to share the same underlying age (for example, samples from the same archaeological layer). In this situation, additional variance components must be considered, including uncertainty in the calibration curve and other environmental factors.

For Case I, assuming normally distributed and independent counting errors with variances $E_i^2$, the pooled (weighted) mean age is calculated as

$$A_p = \frac{\sum_{i=1}^{n} (A_i / E_i^2)}{\sum_{i=1}^{n} (1 / E_i^2)}$$

where $A_i$ is the reported age of the $i$-th determination. The variance of the pooled mean is

$$V(A_p) = \left( \sum_{i=1}^{n} 1/E_i^2 \right)^{-1}$$.

To test the hypothesis that the determinations are statistically consistent (i.e., estimate the same true age), a chi-square test statistic is computed:

$$T = \sum_{i=1}^{n} \frac{(A_i - A_p)^2}{E_i^2}$$

Under the null hypothesis of homogeneity, $T$ follows a chi-square distribution with $n - 1$ degrees of freedom. If the calculated value does not exceed the critical value at the chosen significance level (commonly 5%), the determinations may be regarded as statistically indistinguishable and combined.

For Case II, Ward and Wilson recommend incorporating additional variance components, so that the total variance for each determination becomes

$$S_i^2 = E_i^2 + F_i^2 + G_i^2$$

where $E_i^2$ represents counting error, $F_i^2$ calibration uncertainty, and $G_i^2$ other applicable variance components. The pooled mean and chi-square statistic are then calculated using $S_i^2$ in place of $E_i^2$.

If the chi-square test indicates significant heterogeneity, the determinations should not be combined without further investigation. Possible causes include underestimated uncertainties, contamination, sample inhomogeneity, or genuine chronological differences. Ward and Wilson emphasized that explicit statistical modelling and variance specification are essential prerequisites for valid comparison and pooling of radiocarbon determinations.
