= History of the Shroud of Turin =

The history of the Shroud of Turin begins in the year 1390 AD, when Bishop Pierre d'Arcis wrote a memorandum where he charged that the Shroud was a forgery. Historical records seem to indicate that a shroud bearing an image of a crucified man existed in the possession of Geoffroy de Charny in the small town of Lirey, France around the years 1353 to 1357. The history from the 15th century to the present is well-documented.

The period until 1390 is subject to debate and controversy among historians. Prior to the 14th century there are some allegedly congruent but controversial references such as the Pray Codex. Although there are numerous reports of Jesus' burial shroud, or an image of his head, of unknown origin, being venerated in various locations before the 14th century, there is no reliable historical evidence that these refer to the shroud currently held at Turin Cathedral. A burial cloth, which some historians maintain was the Shroud, was owned by the Byzantine emperors but disappeared during the Sack of Constantinople in 1204. Barbara Frale has cited that the Order of Knights Templar were in the possession of a relic showing a red, monochromatic image of a bearded man on linen or cotton.

In 1453 Margaret de Charny deeded the Shroud to the House of Savoy. In 1532, the shroud suffered damage from a fire in the church in Chambery, France where it was stored. A drop of molten silver from the reliquary produced a symmetrically placed mark through the layers of the folded cloth. Poor Clare Nuns attempted to repair this damage with patches. Repairs were made to the shroud in 1694 by Sebastian Valfrè to improve the repairs of the Poor Clare nuns. Further repairs were made in 1868 by Clotilde of Savoy.

In 1578 the House of Savoy took the shroud to Turin and it has remained at Turin Cathedral ever since. As of the 17th century the Shroud has been displayed (e.g. in the chapel built for that purpose by Guarino Guarini) and in 1898 it was first photographed during a public exhibition. The Shroud remained the property of the House of Savoy until 1983, when it was given to the Holy See, the rule of the House of Savoy having ended in 1946.

A fire, possibly caused by arson, threatened the Shroud on 11 April 1997. In 2002, the Holy See had the Shroud restored. The cloth backing and thirty patches were removed, making it possible to photograph and scan the reverse side of the cloth, which had been hidden from view for centuries. The Shroud was exhibited to the public from August 8 to August 12, 2018. Andrea Nicolotti in a 2019 critical analysis of the Shroud's historical provenance, concludes the documented evidence and physical testing point to its origin in the High Middle Ages, while earlier references to burial cloths or image bearing relics refer to different objects and legends.

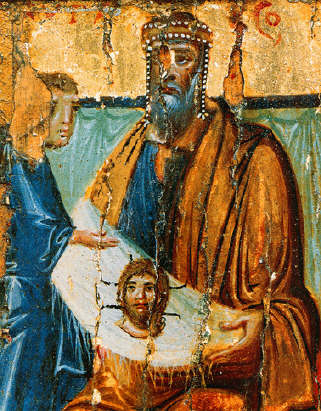
This 10th-century image shows Abgarus of Edessa displaying the Image of Edessa. The oblong cloth shown here is unusual for depictions of the image, leading some to suggest that the artist was influenced by seeing the Shroud.

== Fringe speculations about early artworks and relics ==
Although there are numerous reports of Jesus' burial shroud, or an image of his head, of unknown origin, being venerated in various locations before the fourteenth century, there is no historical evidence that these refer to the shroud currently at Turin Cathedral. Various speculations have attempted to link the Shroud of Turin with the legendary Image of Edessa although no legend connected with that image suggests that it contained the image of a beaten and bloody Jesus. Others have denied the possibility of the Turin shroud being identified with the Image of Edessa, on various grounds.

Shroud proponents cite an illustration in the Codex Pray, an Illuminated manuscript written in Budapest, Hungary between 1192 and 1195, as evidence for the shroud's existence before the fourteenth century. However Italian Shroud researcher Gian Marco Rinaldi interprets the item that is sometimes identified as the Shroud as a probable rectangular tombstone as seen on other sacred images. Rinaldi also points out that the alleged shroud in the Pray Codex does not contain any image of a human body, and that a wadded cloth is clearly visible on top of this object.

== 14th and 15th centuries ==
The fullest academic account of the history of the Shroud since its first appearance in 1355 is John Beldon-Scott, Architecture for the Shroud: Relic and Ritual in Turin, University of Chicago Press, 2003. This study is indispensable for its many illustrations that show features of the Shroud images now lost.

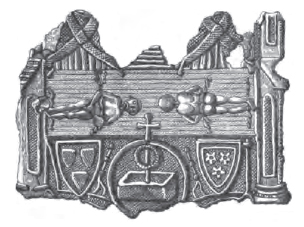
The pilgrim medallion of Lirey (Drawing by Arthur Forgeais, 1865)

The 14th century attribution of the origin of the shroud refers to a shroud in Lirey, France dating to 1353–1357. It is related that the widow of the French knight Geoffroi de Charny had it displayed in a church at Lirey, France (diocese of Troyes). According to the 1913 Catholic Encyclopedia:

On 20 June 1353, Geoffroy de Charny, Lord of Savoisy and Lirey, founded at Lirey in honour of the Annunciation a collegiate church with six canonries, and in this church he exposed for veneration the Holy Winding Sheet. Opposition arose on the part of the Bishop of Troyes, who declared after due inquiry that the relic was nothing but a painting, and opposed its exposition. Clement VI by four Bulls, 6 Jan., 1390, approved the exposition as lawful. In 1418 during the civil wars, the canons entrusted the Winding Sheet to Humbert, Count de La Roche, Lord of Lirey. Margaret, widow of Humbert, never returned it but gave it in 1452 to the Duke of Savoy. The requests of the canons of Lirey were unavailing, and the Lirey Winding Sheet is the same that is now exposed and honoured at Turin."

In the Museum Cluny in Paris, the coats of arms of this knight and his widow can be seen on a pilgrim medallion, which also shows an image of the Shroud of Turin.

During the fourteenth century, the shroud was often publicly exposed, though not continuously, because the bishop of Troyes, Henry of Poitiers, had prohibited veneration of the image. Thirty-two years after this pronouncement, the image was displayed again, and King Charles VI of France ordered its removal to Troyes, citing the impropriety of the image. The sheriffs were unable to carry out the order.

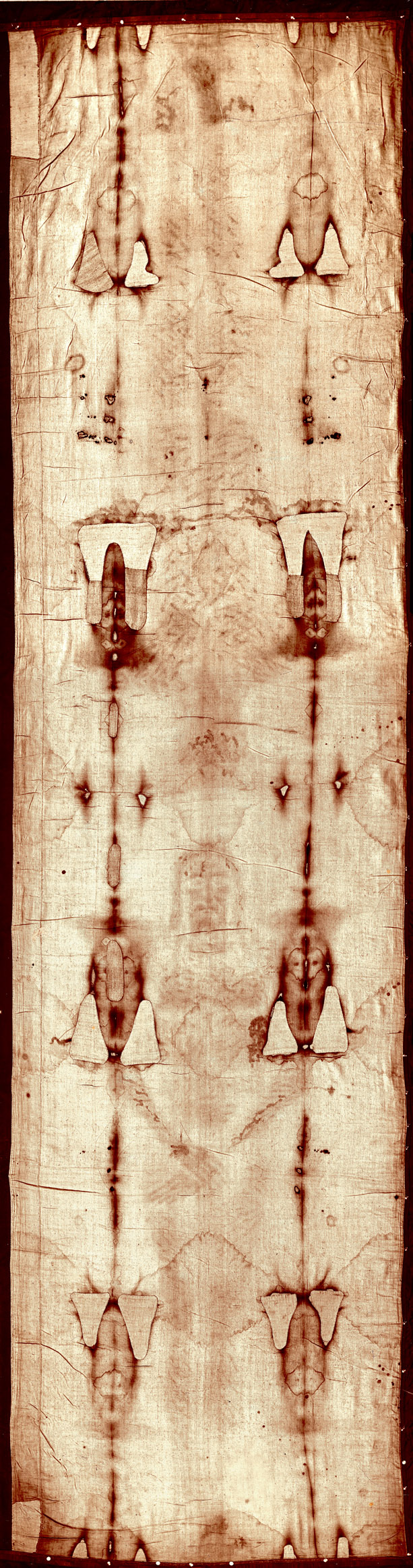
Full-length image of the Shroud of Turin

In 1389, the image was denounced as a fraud by Bishop Pierre d'Arcis in a letter to the Avignon Antipope Clement VII, mentioning that the image had previously been denounced by his predecessor Henri de Poitiers, who had been concerned that no such image was mentioned in scripture. Bishop D'Arcis continued, "Eventually, after diligent inquiry and examination, he discovered how the said cloth had been cunningly painted, the truth being attested by the artist who had painted it, to wit, that it was a work of human skill and not miraculously wrought or bestowed." (In German:.) The artist is not named in the letter. The bishop stated during the Shroud's initial exhibition, a number of people were also hired to pretend to be healed to fool the crowds. He too recalled that during de Poitiers investigation, many other theologians declared it could not be the real shroud of Jesus.

The letter of Bishop D'Arcis also mentions Bishop Henri's attempt to suppress veneration but notes that the cloth was quickly hidden "for 35 years or so", thus agreeing with the historical details already established above. The letter provides an accurate description of the cloth: "upon which by a clever sleight of hand was depicted the twofold image of one man, that is to say, the back and the front, he falsely declaring and pretending that this was the actual shroud in which our Saviour Jesus Christ was enfolded in the tomb, and upon which the whole likeness of the Saviour had remained thus impressed together with the wounds which He bore."

Despite the pronouncement of Bishop D'Arcis, Antipope Clement VII (first antipope of the Western Schism) did not revoke the permission given earlier to the church of Lirey to display the object, but instructed its clergy that it should not be treated as a relic and should not be presented to the public as the actual shroud of Christ, but as an image or representation of it. He prescribed indulgences for the many pilgrims who came to the church out of devotion for "even a representation of this kind", so that veneration continued.

Around the years 1370–1392, Nicole Oresme would also denounce the Shroud of Turin as a forgery that was being used by clergy to gain offerings for churches.

In 1418, Humbert de Villersexel, Count de la Roche, Lord of Saint-Hippolyte-sur-Doubs, moved the shroud to his castle at Montfort, Doubs, to provide protection against criminal bands, after he married Charny's granddaughter Margaret. It was later moved to Saint-Hippolyte-sur-Doubs. After Humbert's death, canons of Lirey fought through the courts to force the widow to return the cloth, but the parlement of Dole and the Court of Besançon left it to the widow, who travelled with the shroud to various expositions, notably in Liège and Geneva.

The widow sold the shroud in exchange for a castle in Varambon, France in 1453. The new owner, Anne of Cyprus, Duchess of Savoy, stored it in the Savoyard capital of Chambéry in the newly built Saint-Chapelle, which Pope Paul II shortly thereafter raised to the dignity of a collegiate church. In 1464, Anne's husband, Louis, Duke of Savoy agreed to pay an annual fee to the Lirey canons in exchange for their dropping claims of ownership of the cloth. Beginning in 1471, the shroud was moved between many cities of Europe, being housed briefly in Vercelli, Turin, Ivrea, Susa, Chambéry, Avigliana, Rivoli, and Pinerolo. A description of the cloth by two sacristans of the Sainte-Chapelle from around this time noted that it was stored in a reliquary: "enveloped in a red silk drape, and kept in a case covered with crimson velours, decorated with silver-gilt nails, and locked with a golden key."

Around 1503 the courtier Antoine de Lalaing recorded an account claiming the Shroud had been tested by fire, water and boiling oil without damaging the image. Historians and scientific analyses have since viewed this as a courtly hyperbole and pious legend.

In 1543 John Calvin, in his Treatise on Relics, wrote of the Shroud, which was then at Nice, "How is it possible that those sacred historians, who carefully related all the miracles that took place at Christ’s death, should have omitted to mention one so remarkable as the likeness of the body of our Lord remaining on its wrapping sheet?" He also noted that, according to St. John, there was one sheet covering Jesus's body, and a separate cloth covering his head. He then stated that "either St. John is a liar," or else anyone who promotes such a shroud is "convicted of falsehood and deceit". Calvin would catalogue a number of cities and towns that purported to have authentic shrouds, and in Europe there were as many as 43 alone, but the distinct Turin Shroud is addressed by him as being the one from Nice.

== 16th century to present ==
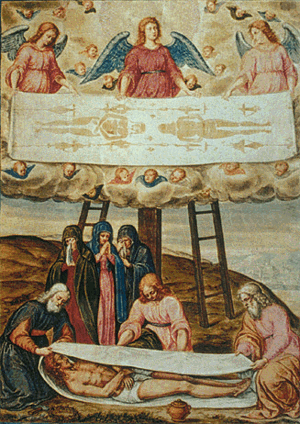
In his painting of the shroud in a Descent from the cross scene, Giulio Clovio made an error and showed the right hand crossed over the left, c. 1540.

The history of the shroud from the middle of the 16th century is well recorded. The existence of a miniature by Giulio Clovio, which gives a good representation of what was seen upon the shroud about the year 1540, confirms that the shroud housed in Turin today is the same one as in the middle of the 16th century. In 1578 the House of Savoy took the shroud to Turin and it has remained at Turin Cathedral ever since.

In 1532, the shroud suffered damage from a fire in the chapel where it was stored. A drop of molten silver from the reliquary produced a symmetrically placed mark through the layers of the folded cloth. Poor Clare Nuns attempted to repair this damage with patches. Some have suggested that there was also water damage from the extinguishing of the fire. However, there is some evidence that the watermarks were made by condensation in the bottom of a burial jar in which the folded shroud may have been kept at some point. In 1578, the shroud arrived again at its current location in Turin. It was the property of the House of Savoy until 1983, when it was given to the Holy See, the rule of the House of Savoy having ended in 1946.

The shroud's modern history begins in 1898 when it was photographed, but a better photo was later taken in 1931. In 1969 the archbishop of Turin appointed a clandestine commission to examine the Shroud, and more detailed studies were investigated again in 1973 where one art expert concluded it was accomplished by an artistic print technique. Further official examinations were conducted by STURP in 1978 onwards.

In 1988, the Holy See agreed to a radiocarbon dating of the relic, for which a small piece from a corner of the shroud was removed, divided, and sent to laboratories. The radiocarbon dating tests established that the shroud was from the Middle Ages, between the years 1260 and 1390. Another fire, possibly caused by arson, threatened the shroud on 11 April 1997, but fireman Mario Trematore was able to remove it from its heavily protected display case and prevent further damage. In 2002, the Holy See had the shroud restored. The cloth backing and thirty patches were removed. This made it possible to photograph and scan the reverse side of the cloth, which had been hidden from view. Using sophisticated mathematical and optical techniques, a ghostly part-image of the body was found on the back of the shroud in 2004. Italian scientists had exposed the faint imprint of the face and hands of the figure. The Shroud was publicly exhibited in 2000 for the Great Jubilee, and in 2010 with the approval of Pope Benedict XVI, and in 2015 with the approval of Pope Francis. Another exhibition is scheduled for 2025.

Detailed comments on this operation were published by various Shroud researchers. In 2003, the principal restorer Mechthild Flury-Lemberg, a textile expert from Switzerland, published a book with the title Sindone 2002: L'intervento conservativo – Preservation – Konservierung (ISBN 88-88441-08-5). She describes the operation and the reasons it was believed necessary. In 2005, William Meacham, an archaeologist who has studied the Shroud since 1981, published the book The Rape of the Turin Shroud (ISBN 1-4116-5769-1) which is fiercely critical of the operation. He rejects the reasons provided by Flury-Lemberg and describes in detail what he calls "a disaster for the scientific study of the relic".

== Historical attributions ==
=== Christian iconography ===
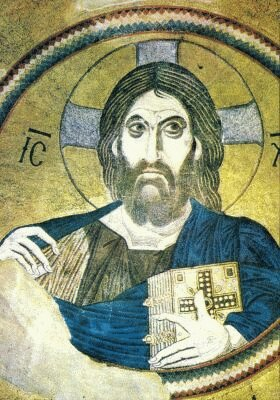
Similarities between traditional icons of Jesus and the image on the shroud have been suggested. This image shows the mosaic Christ Pantocrator from the Daphni Monastery in Athens.

Art historian W.S.A. Dale proposed that the Shroud was an icon created for liturgical use, and suggested an 11th-century date based on art-historical grounds.

=== Analysis of proportion ===
The man on the image is taller than the average first-century resident of Judaea and the right hand has longer fingers than the left, along with a significant increase of length in the right forearm compared to the left.

=== Analysis of optical perspective ===
Further evidence for the Shroud as an art object comes from what might be called the "Mercator projection" argument. The shroud in two dimensions presents a three-dimensional image projected onto a planar (two-dimensional) surface, just as in a photograph or painting. This perspective is consistent with both painting and with image formation using a bas relief.

=== Variegated images ===
Banding on the Shroud is background noise, which causes us to see the gaunt face, long nose, deep eyes, and straight hair. These features are caused by dark vertical and horizontal bands that go across the eyes. Using enhancement software (fast Fourier transform filters), the effect of these bands can be minimized. The result is a more detailed image of the shroud.

=== Burial posture ===
The burial posture of the shroud, with hands crossed over the pelvis, was used by Essenes (2nd century BC to the 1st century AD), but was also found in a burial site under a medieval church with skeletons which were dated pre-1390 and post Roman.

=== Leonardo da Vinci ===
In June 2009, the British television station Channel 5 aired a documentary that claimed the shroud was forged by Leonardo da Vinci.

Recently a study stated that the Shroud of Turin had been faked by Leonardo da Vinci. According to the study, the Renaissance artist created the artifact by using pioneering photographic techniques and a sculpture of his own head, and suggests that the image on the relic is Leonardo's face which could have been projected onto the cloth, The Daily Telegraph reported.

=== History Today article ===
In an article published by History Today in November 2014, British scholar Charles Freeman analyses early depictions and descriptions of the Shroud and argues that the iconography of the bloodstains and all-over scourge marks are not known before 1300 and the Shroud was a painted linen at that date, with the paint having disintegrated leaving a discoloured linen image underneath. He also argues that the dimensions and format of the weave are typical of a medieval treadle loom. As it was unlikely that a forger would have deceived anyone with a single cloth with images on it, Freeman seeks an alternative function. He goes on to argue that the Shroud was a medieval prop used in Easter ritual plays depicting the resurrection of Christ. He believes it was used in a ceremony called the 'Quem Quaeritis?' or 'whom do you seek?' which involved re-enacting gospel accounts of the resurrection, and is represented as such in the well-known Lirey pilgrim badge. As such it was deservedly an object of veneration from the fourteenth century as it is still is today.

A 1600–1625 engraving of the Shroud of Turin, by Willem de Haen.

Freeman also pointed out that the original image of the Shroud was more prominent and detailed in the past, but has since faded overtime. This is seen in features such as the crown of thorns, long hair, blood stain renderings, and the loincloth which can no longer be seen as clearly today as they were once depicted. Historical texts describing the Shroud confirm the accuracy of Antonio Tempesta's 1613 engraving which features a fully visible painting. The painted loincloth in particular was potentially added on after the Council of Trent in 1562-63 which banned nudity in religious art, as all prior depictions of it are naked. It first appears when the Shroud was publicly displayed at Turin in 1578 after the relic's transfer, and in the renditions of Giovanni Testa, being seen from then on, including a 1579 engraving by Carlo Malliano, suggesting artists were copying from the updated image. He concludes the Turin Shroud looked very different in the 16th and 17th centuries than how it looks nowadays.

To the linen's image itself, he observes the two images on both sides do not even represent the same body, and there are 7 cm of length differences between the bodies. The heads do not meet, indicating the cloth was never folded over an actual head, while the hair and blood are falling down as it would on a standing figure, rather than flowing naturally back from one lying down. Freeman does not ultimately believe the intention was a deliberate forgery, but instead meant for devotional use as an object of veneration, and it was never intended to be seen as the actual burial shroud of Christ.
