= Shroud of Turin Research Project =

Researchers of the Shroud of Turin

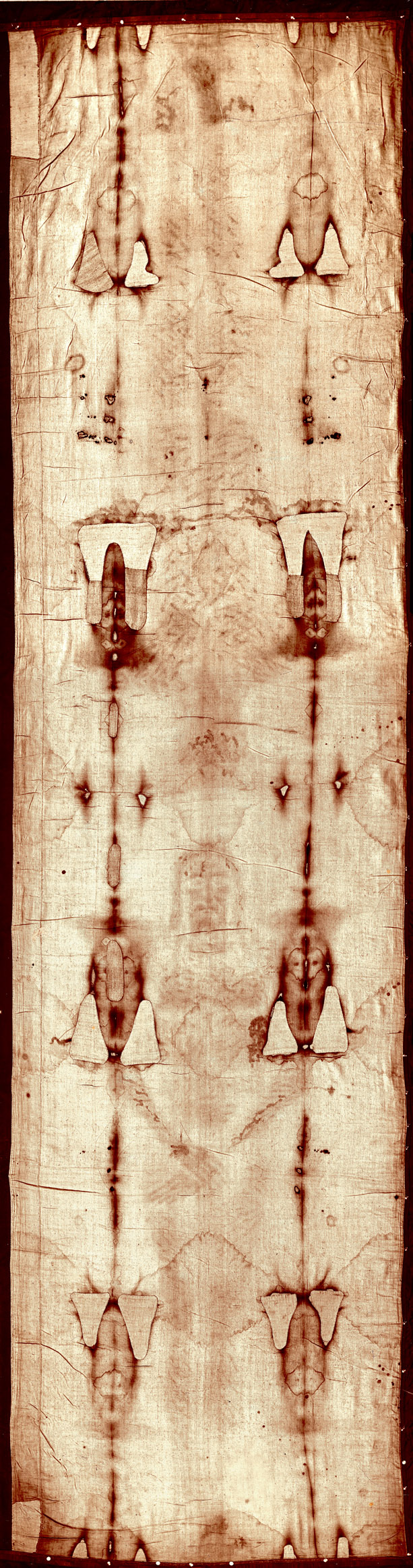
Full-length image of the Shroud of Turin.

The Shroud of Turin Research Project (often abbreviated as STURP) refers to a team of scientists which performed a set of experiments and analyses on the Shroud of Turin during the late 1970s and early 1980s. STURP issued its final report in 1981.

== History ==
The origins of the group go back to the experiments of physicist John P. Jackson, thermodynamicist Eric Jumper and radiographer William Mottern in 1976. Using the ideas invented in aerospace science for building three dimensional models from images of Mars, Eric Jumper built initial devices to test the photographs of the Shroud of Turin. These were the first experiments relating to the shroud performed by scientists.

In March 1977, Jackson, Jumper and Mottern invited a few other scientists to join them to form a team for the analysis of the Shroud. The first meeting took place in Albuquerque, New Mexico. The group had no official sponsorship and the scientists funded their own activities. They also managed to arrange gifts and loans of technical equipment whose value was estimated at over $2 million.

Nuclear physicist Tom D'Muhala joined the team to lead logistics for STURP. Apart from Jackson, Jumper, and Motten the team included thermal chemist Raymond N. Rogers, Ron London, and Roger Morris, all from Los Alamos National Laboratory. Other team members included Don Lynn of the Jet Propulsion Laboratory in Pasadena, biophysicist John Heller, photographers Vern Miller and Barrie Schwortz, optical physicist Sam Pellicori, and electric power experts John D. German and Rudy Dichtl, as well as forensic pathologist Robert Bucklin. STURP included no experts on medieval art, archaeology, or textiles.

To commemorate the 400th anniversary of the arrival of the shroud in Turin, it was displayed to the public in Turin from 27 August to 8 October 1978, with about 3 million visitors attending the exposition under bullet-proof glass. For the next 5 days after the exposition the STURP team analyzed the shroud around the clock at the royal palace adjoining Turin Cathedral, some scientists sleeping while others worked. A team of European scientists headed by Luigi Gonella supervised the activities. The team gathered sticky tape samples of material from several points on the surface of the shroud.

STURP team members continued their research after access to the shroud and published many of theirs results in scientific journals and proceedings. In 1981, in its final report, STURP wrote:

We can conclude for now that the Shroud image is that of a real human form of a scourged, crucified man. It is not the product of an artist. The blood stains are composed of hemoglobin and also give a positive test for serum albumin. The image is an ongoing mystery and until further chemical studies are made, perhaps by this group of scientists, or perhaps by some scientists in the future, the problem remains unsolved.

Joe Nickell of the Committee for Skeptical Inquiry has pointed out that "STURP's leaders served on the executive council of the Holy Shroud Guild, which is devoted to the "cause" of the reputed relic", a group whose motivation it was to campaign for the legitimacy of the Turin shroud. While paleontologist Steven Schafersman has described it as "an organization totally composed of believers in the authenticity of the Shroud", with the exception of a single agnostic being Walter McCrone. Historian Charles Freeman noted that STURP did not have a single expert in the history of relic cults, textile weaving, or in the iconography of medieval paintings. He also highlighted that they never conducted any investigations into the kinds of looms to produce a cloth of its size, whether ancient or medieval, nor did anyone examine the many historical depictions and textual descriptions of the Shroud.

== Members of STURP in 1978 ==
1978 STURP members:

- Joseph S. Accetta, Lockheed Corporation (Turin researcher in 1978)
- Alan Adler, Western Connecticut State University
- Steven Baumgart, Air Force Weapons Laboratory (Turin researcher in 1978)
- Ernest H. Brooks II, Brooks Institute of Photography (Turin researcher in 1978)
- Robert Bucklin, Harris County, Texas, Medical Examiner's Office (Turin researcher in 1978)
- Donald Devan, Oceanographic Services Inc. (Turin researcher in 1978)
- Robert Dinegar, Los Alamos National Laboratory (Turin researcher in 1978)
- Rudolph J. Dichtl, University of Colorado (Turin researcher in 1978)
- Thomas F. D'Muhala, Nuclear Technology Corporation (Turin researcher in 1978)
- Jim Drusik, Natural History Museum of Los Angeles County
- Mark Evans, Brooks Institute of Photography (Turin researcher in 1978)
- Joseph M. Gambescia Sr., St. Agnes Medical Center – Medical analysis
- John D. German, Air Force Weapons Laboratory (Turin researcher in 1978)
- Roger Gilbert, Oriel Corporation (Turin researcher in 1978)
- Marty Gilbert, Oriel Corporation (Turin researcher in 1978)
- Thomas Haverty, Rocky Mountain Thermograph (Turin researcher in 1978)
- John Heller, New England Institute
- John P. Jackson, U.S. Air Force Academy (Turin researcher in 1978)
- Donald Janney, Los Alamos National Laboratories (Turin researcher in 1978)
- Joan Janney, Los Alamos National Laboratories (Turin researcher in 1978)
- Eric J. Jumper, U.S. Air Force Academy (Turin researcher in 1978)
- J. Ronald London, Los Alamos National Laboratory (Turin researcher in 1978)
- Jean Lorre, Jet Propulsion Laboratory (Turin researcher in 1978)
- Donald J. Lynn, Jet Propulsion Laboratory (Turin researcher in 1978)
- Vernon D. Miller, Brooks Institute of Photography (Turin researcher in 1978)
- Roger A. Morris, Los Alamos National Laboratory (Turin researcher in 1978)
- Robert W. Mottern, Sandia Laboratories (Turin researcher in 1978)
- Samuel Pellicori, Santa Barbara Research Center (Turin researcher in 1978)
- Raymond Rogers, Los Alamos National Laboratory (Turin researcher in 1978)
- Larry Schwalbe, Los Alamos National Laboratory
- Barrie M. Schwortz, Barrie Schwortz Studios (Turin researcher in 1978)
- Diane Soran, Los Alamos National Laboratory
- Kenneth E. Stevenson, IBM (Turin researcher in 1978)
