= June Werner =

American nursing executive and educator

June Werner RN, MN, MSN, CNAA
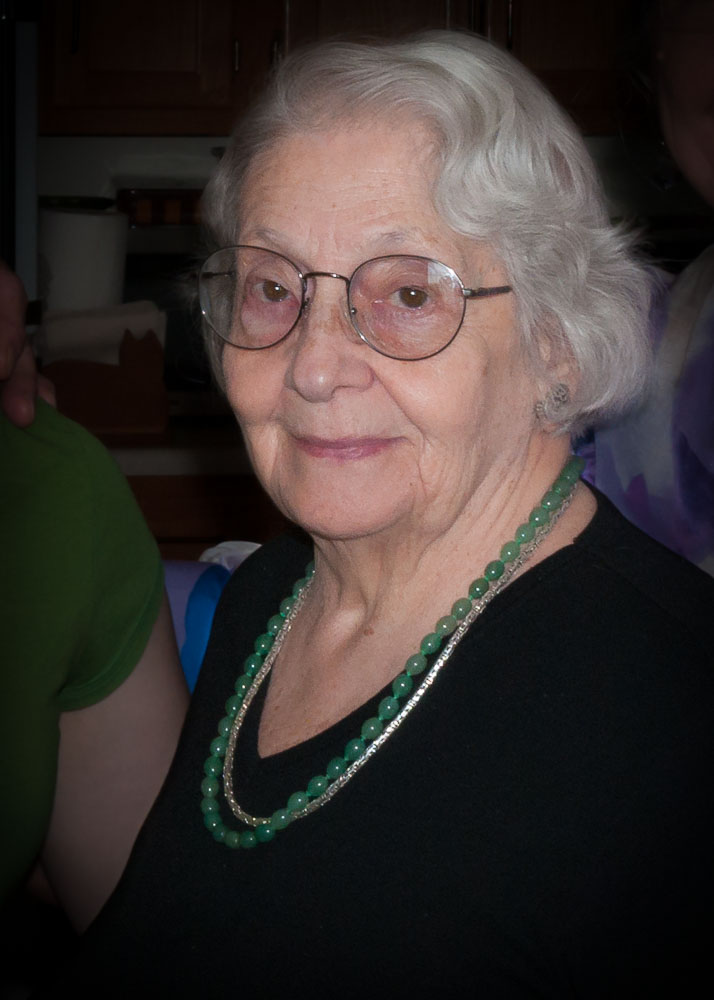
- August, 2010
- Born: Elizabeth June Travers; April 3, 1924; Fall River, Massachusetts
- Died: May 18, 2015 (aged 91); Albuquerque, New Mexico
- Citizenship: USA
- Education: St. Xavier College, Chicago; Syracuse University; Columbia Presbyterian Hospital School of Nursing
- Occupations: 1971–1990 Chair of the Department of Nursing at Evanston Hospital Corp., Evanston, Illinois
- Years active: 1945–2015
- Employer: Evanston Hospital Corp.
- Organization: Department of Nursing
- Known for: Primary nursing, mentorship, leadership, change management, role model
- Spouse: Oswald Werner

Elizabeth June Werner (née Travers; April 3, 1924 – May 18, 2015) was an American nursing executive and educator. She was chair of the department of nursing for 19 years at Evanston Hospital, Illinois, and retired in 1990 as chairperson emerita. During this period she launched the nation's first primary nursing model, changing the relationship between patients and their caregivers as well as mentoring the nursing staff.

== Early life ==
Werner was born to John Travers and Sarah (née McGee) in Fall River, Massachusetts and grew up in the Bronx, New York during the Great Depression. Role models during those difficult times led her to become a nurse.

Werner was admitted to Columbia University's School of Nursing and graduated in 1945. She started her career in several Vermont hospitals and as a Public Health Nurse in the late 1950's. She completed a BSN in Nursing Education and an MSN in Nursing Administration at Syracuse University School of Nursing, New York. Upon graduation she was hired as an Instructor/Assistant Professor at the School of Nursing.

== Career ==
In 1961, she moved to Bloomington, Indiana, where she worked as a nursing administration consultant at Bloomington Hospital that "[had] not seen changes in 30 years." During 1967 and 1968 Werner spent 15 months on the Navajo Reservation and was the school nurse in the Kayenta, Arizona, Public School.

In 1971, she became chair of the Department of Nursing and was the only woman among the chairs of clinical departments at Evanston Hospital, Illinois. During her tenure from 1971 to 1990 she pioneered the nation's first primary nursing implementation, a model developed by Marie Manthey which transformed the relationship between patients and their caregivers. Because of this, Evanston Hospital was recognized as an early adapter and an outstanding model of full implementation of a professional practice model, including formalizing mentoring and professionalizing nursing staff.

These actions by Werner helped Evanston Hospital attract the qualified and dedicated nursing staff, leading to "... one of the first Magnet nursing departments in the country."

While professionally active, Werner impacted nursing management and nursing education both locally and nationally:

- 2001–2002 President of the Board of Health Action New Mexico, a period of growth for HANM
- 1978–1994 Clinical Professor, Department of Administrative Studies, College of Nursing, University of Illinois
- 1990–1992 Senior Vice President for Patient Care, Franciscan Sisters of the Poor, Health System.
- 1989–1990 Chairperson, Joint Commission on Accreditation of Health Organizations (JCAHO) Task Force on Nursing Standards.
- 1987–1988 Member, (JCAHO) Task Force on Effective Organization Management.
- 1990–1996 Board Member, Visiting Nurse Association, Evanston, Illinois
- 1988–1990 Board Member, Franciscan Sisters of the Poor, Health System.
- 1982–1986 Board Member, Evanston Hospital Corporation, Evanston, Illinois. This was the first time in the country that a Nurse Executive was appointed to serve on the Hospital Board at the same institution where the Nurse Executive was employed.
- 1982–1990 Nurse Executive Conference Group, University of Illinois, Past Chairperson, Charter Member.
- 1982–1984 Board Member, American Society for Nursing Service Administrators (ASNSA)
- 1971–1990 Chairperson, Department of Nursing, Evanston Hospital Corporation. Evanston Hospital was one of 41 hospitals in the country designated as a Magnet Hospital by the American Academy of Nursing.
- 1984–1987 President Elect, President, and Past President of the American Organization of Nurse Executives (AONE).
- 1980–1983 Member, Board of Directors, American Organization of Nurse Executives (AONE).
- 1978–1990 Chairperson, Illinois Hospital Association, Council on Nursing.
- 1978–1981 Illinois Hospital Licensing Board, advisor to the Department of Public Health

== Retirement ==
She retired from Evanston Hospital in 1990 and was named chairperson emerita of Evanston Hospital Corporation, Department of Nursing. In Albuquerque, New Mexico, she served as board chair of Health Action New Mexico, a healthcare issue advocacy group. She also led Compassion and Choices which focused on protecting the right to death with dignity. She and her husband Oswald Werner spent time and effort on social issues such as the repeal of the death penalty to the implementation of universal health care.

== Honors and awards ==
In 2015 Werner was a Health Action New Mexico, 20-for-20 Honoree, which was received after her death. The First National Mentoring Award by Creative HealthCare Management was granted in 1995.

The Illinois Nurses Association Board of Directors honored June Werner on her retirement as Vice President of Nursing from Evanston Hospital in 1990. 1990 also saw her receive the Jean McVicar Outstanding Nurse Executive Award, National League of Nursing "...for excellence and creativity at the national level." Zonta's Woman of the Year Award, Evanston, Illinois was also awarded to Werner in 1990.

She received the Distinguished Alumna Award by the Columbia Presbyterian Hospital, School of Nursing, New York City in 1978.

== Selected works ==
- Werner, June (January 1, 2002). Mentoring and its potential nursing role. Creative Nursing, 8, 3, 13-14.
- Durburg, S. K., & Werner, J. (1989). Reentering the professional practice environment. Addiction in the nursing profession, 148-165.
- Werner, June (1988). "June Werner". In Schorr, Thelma M.; Zimmerman, Anne (eds.). Making Choices, Taking Chances: Nurse Leaders Tell Their Stories. St. Louis, Missouri: The C. V. Mosby Company. ISBN 0801646111.
- Beyers, M., Werner, J., & Durburg, S. (1984). Complete guide to cancer nursing. Medical Economics Books.
- Werner, J., & Nursing Resources National Conference and Exhibition. (1982). Putting nursing into the decision making arena: Power and politics. Chicago: Teach'em.
- Adelson B, Werner J. Fostering collaborative relationships. Hosp Med Staff. 1981;10(3):5-10.
- Werner, J. (1980). Joint endeavors: the way to bring service and education together. Nursing outlook, 28(9), 546-50.
- Cbaska, N. L., Martin, N., Zercher, A., Hartigan, E., & Werner, J. (1980). A Joint Effort to Mediate the 'Outside Source'Staffing Dilemma. JONA: The Journal of Nursing Administration, 10(12), 13-17.
- Werner, J. (1979). Primary nursing. In Highlights of Chief, Nursing Service Workshop, Held Nov. 7-11, 1977 (p. 17). Veterans Administration.
- Grayce M Sills, June Werner (1977) Strategies for leadership : problem solving, American Journal of Nursing Company. Educational Services Division, The Division, New York, DVD & VHS
- Werner, J., Page, J. O., & Church, O. (1977). The Evanston story: primary nursing comes alive. Nursing Administration Quarterly, 28.
