= CMSA =

CMSA may refer to:

- Chain Makers' and Strikers' Association, a former British trade union
- Chicago Math and Science Academy
- China Manned Space Agency, the human spaceflight agency of China
- China Maritime Safety Administration
- Classical Mandolin Society of America
- Colleges of Medicine of South Africa
- Combinatorial Mathematics Society of Australasia
- Commercial Mortgage Securities Association
- Congressional Muslim Staffer Association
- Consolidated Metropolitan Statistical Area

== See also ==
- Case management (disambiguation)
