= Darrell A. Posey =

American scientist (1947–2001)

Darrell Addison Posey
- Born: March 14, 1947; Henderson, Kentucky
- Died: March 6, 2001 (aged 53); Oxford, UK
- Education: Louisiana State University; B.A., M.A. University of Georgia; Ph.D. Anthropology
- Known for: Defense of Amazonian Indians and indigenous intellectual property rights
- Awards: UN Global 500 award
- Scientific career
- Fields: Entomology, Ethnobiology
- Workplaces: Museu Paraense; Emílio Goeldi
- Doctoral advisor: Michael D. Olien
- Other academic advisors: William G. Haag

Darrell Addison Posey (March 14, 1947 – March 6, 2001) was an American anthropologist and biologist who vitalized the study of traditional knowledge of indigenous and folk populations in Brazil and other countries. He called his approach ethnobiology and combined research with respect for other cultures, especially indigenous intellectual property rights.

An obituary described him as an "anthropologist who gave up scholarly detachment to fight for the rights of native peoples." He never married and was survived by his parents and brother. He died of a brain tumor, at 53 years of age, in Oxford, England, where he made his home after 1992.

== Early life ==
Darrell A. Posey was born on March 14, 1947, son of Henry and Pearl Posey, in rural Henderson, Kentucky. From an early age he was a member of the Anglican Church. Educated at Henderson County High School, he had a biology teacher, Mr. Ned Barra, who encouraged his interest in insects.

== University studies ==
In 1970, Posey was graduated with a B.Sc. in Entomology, by the Louisiana State University, Baton Rouge, Louisiana. He obtained a M.A. in Anthropology, in 1974, also at the Louisiana State University, with the thesis The Fifth Ward Settlement: A Tri Racial Marginal Group. He obtained a Ph.D. in anthropology, in 1979, at the University of Georgia, Athens, Georgia, with the thesis Ethnoentomology of the Gorotire Kayapó of Central Brazil.

Posey's switch from entomology to anthropology was due to his friendship with anthropology professor William G. Haag at Louisiana State University. This is explained in a memorial by Posey.

Even after his move to anthropology, Posey did not cut his ties with entomology. At the University of Georgia, he was a close associate of entomology professor Murray S. Blum. Years afterward, he continued to research the ethnobiology of insects, a field he termed "ethnoentomology" in his 1979 doctoral thesis.

== Kayapó studies ==
Arriving in Brazil in 1976, Posey made lasting friendships with researchers at the Museu Paraense Emílio Goeldi, in Belém, and the Instituto Nacional de Pesquisas da Amazônia, in Manaus.

After his graduate studies, Posey returned to Brazil in 1982, as a professor in the Department of Biology at the Federal University of Maranhão in São Luís, then reorganized under the chairmanship of geneticist Dr. Warwick E. Kerr. He mounted an interdisciplinary ethnobiological research project, called the Kayapó Project, that would eventually involve over 30 specialists in fields such as agronomy, botany, entomology, plant genetics, astronomy, soil sciences, human geography, anthropology, and linguistics. To document the extensive traditional biological knowledge of the Kayapó, Posey and collaborators spent months in the field with Kayapó specialists such as chiefs Uté, Toto-i, Kanhunk, and Paulinho Paiakan. Pajés Beptopup and Kwyre-ka also offered their experience. Many conferences with scientific and indigenous project participants served to disseminate project results, especially at Brazilian scientific conclaves.

The Kayapó Project continued when Posey relocated in 1986 to the Goeldi Museum in Belém, Brazil, at the invitation of museum director Dr. Guilherme M. de La Penha. In 1988 he organized the First International Congress of Ethnobiology, in Belém, during which the Kayapó Project and its results were highlighted.

== Ethnobiological research ==
Although the term "ethnobiology" had been used in the past for a different idea, Posey adopted this for his study of indigenous and folk knowledge about plants, animals, and ecosystems. To designate other areas of indigenous and folk knowledge, the term "ethnoscience" can be used in an analogous manner.

In the past, anthropology had been wed to biology in the unholy union of biological determinism, in which Man is treated wholly without culture or the ability to learn. Posey repudiated this view and dared to see indigenous and folk societies as the inheritors of a vast corpus of useful knowledge for the sustainable utilization and management of natural resources. As can be seen in his review of Diamond's best-seller Guns, Germs and Steel: The Fates of Human Societies in 1999, Posey would have biological determinism laid to rest. After all, where can one find human groups without culture?

=== Posey's concept ===
For ethnobiology to be scientific, testable hypotheses are generated from information offered by indigenous and folk informants. The emic-etic filter has to be respected, and a decoding of traditional knowledge is necessary to bridge the two cultures.

=== Field research methods ===
Participant-observation in the field with indigenous and traditional communities was always part of Posey's work plan.

Interviews with informants were always unstructured and conducted according to the generative method, specifically designed not to elicit information offered in support of researchers' perceived biases.

=== Examples from Posey's work ===
Do the Kayapó Indians manage their natural resources? Do they plant forest islands in the savanna? Do they recognize eco-zones and know what resources are to be found in each? Is their agriculture sustainable? Their hunting? What about their medicine? Does what they know constitute a science?

== Activism ==
In his activism, Posey incurred opposition not only from those who would exploit natural resources belonging to Indians but also from scientists and academics who were callous in their disregard for indigenous intellectual property rights. One Brazilian weekly news magazine, Veja, referred to him as a "gigolo of the Indians" for his defense of Indians' human and civil rights.

=== Indian lands ===
Posey's support for indigenous peoples brought him into conflict with the Brazilian government in 1987, when Paiakan and Kube-l, two young Kayapó leaders he was accompanying in Washington, D.C., complained to World Bank officials of a planned hydro-electric dam on the Xingu River that would flood Indian lands. The threat of criminal prosecution from the federal government against Posey and the Kayapó chiefs, for interfering in Brazilian foreign affairs, caused a public outcry both in Brazil and abroad.

In February 1989, Darrell helped organize the "First Meeting of the Indigenous Peoples of the Xingu", the first joint meeting of Amazonian tribes to protest the destruction of the forest, in Altamira, Pará. This event focussed on hydro-electric dams on the Xingu River and caused these ecologically disastrous projects to be cancelled or at least reformulated. In 2008, however, these once-discarded projects are again being proposed by the Brazilian government, with slightly different packaging.

In 1992, Posey was the main organizer of the Earth Parliament, a parallel event at the United Nations' Rio de Janeiro Conference on the Environment (Rio Earth Summit), aimed at valuing indigenous knowledge and rights. The Earth Parliament was a 15-day assembly of indigenous and minority groups held during the 1992 Earth Summit.

=== Biodiversity conservation ===
For Posey, indigenous knowledge was a key to the sustainable use of natural biotic resources. major

=== Indigenous intellectual property rights ===
Like collective rights to land, Indians and other traditional societies have collective intellectual property rights (IPR) to their knowledge. Posey championed the cause of indigenous and folk intellectual property rights during the last decade of his life.

=== Bioethics of ethnobiology ===
Western society has appropriated indigenous and traditional knowledge without recompensation or even recognition. Posey questioned whether scientific research, even of the most disinterested sort, might not lead to the violation of indigenous intellectual property rights or bio-piracy.

==== Declaration of Belém ====
During the July 19–24, 1988 International Congress of Ethnobiology, organized by Posey in Belém, the following document was adopted.

Declaration of Belém

Leading anthropologists, biologists, chemists, sociologists and representatives of several indigenous populations met in to discuss common concerns at the First International Congress of Ethnobiology and to found International Society of ethnobiology. Major concerns outlined by conference contributors were the study of the ways that indigenous and rural populations uniquely perceive, utilize, and manage their natural resources and the development of programs that will guarantee the preservation of vital biological and cultural diversity. This declaration was articulated.

As ethnobiologists, we are alarmed that: SINCE

- Tropical forests and other fragile ecosystems are disappearing;
- Many species, both plant and animal, are threatened with extinction;
- Indigenous cultures around the world are being disrupted and destroyed.

AND GIVEN

- That economic, agricultural and health conditions of people are dependent on these resources;
- That native people have been stewards of 95% of the world's genetic resources, and
- That there is an inextricable link between cultural and biological diversity.

WE, MEMBERS OF THE INTERNATIONAL SOCIETY OF ETHNOBIOLOGY STRONGLY URGE ACTIONS AS FOLLOWS:

- Henceforth, a substantial proportion of development aid must be covered to efforts aimed at ehnobiological inventory, conservation, and management programs;
- Mechanisms be established by which indigenous specialists are recognized as proper Authorities and are consulted in all programs affecting them, their resources, and their environments;
- All other inalienable human rights be recognized and guaranteed, including cultural and linguistic identity;
- Procedures must be developed to compensate native peoples for the utilization of their knowledge and their biological resources;
- Educational programs must be implemented to alert the global community to the value of ethnobiological knowledge for human well-being;
- All medical programs include the recognition of and respect for traditional healers and the incorporation of traditional health practices that enhance the health status of these populations;
- Ethnobiologists make available the results of their research to the native peoples with whom they have worked, especially including dissemination in the native language;
- Exchange of information should be promoted among indigenous and rural peoples regarding conservation, management, and sustainable utilization of resources.

Belém, Brazil, July 1988

== Legacy ==
Posey was a full researcher ("Pesquisador Titular") for the Brazilian National Council for Science and Technology at the Goeldi Museum, Belém, Brazil. He was Director of the Programme for Traditional Resource Rights of the Oxford Centre for the Environment, Ethics and Society and a Fellow of Linacre College, at the University of Oxford. He was Founding President of the International Society of Ethnobiology and was President of the Global Coalition for Bio-Cultural Diversity, under whose auspices he founded the Working Group on Traditional Resource Rights which he coordinated. He was the first recipient of the Sierra Club's "Chico Mendes Award for Outstanding Bravery in Defense of the Environment", and in 1993 he received the United Nations Global 500 Award for "Outstanding Achievement in Service to the Environment."

The International Society of Ethnobiology (ISE) created the "ISE Darrel Posey Fellowship for Ethnoecology and Traditional Resource Rights" in order to "promote understanding of peoples' complex and dynamic relationship with their environment, and supports indigenous peoples and local communities working to sustainably manage, and security rights to, their environments and resources. The Darrell Posey fellowship for ethnoecology and traditional resource rights was launched in 2004 with a grant from the Christensen Fund, and is administrated by the International Society of Ethnobiology, of which Darrell Posey was a founder.".

The June 2008 11th International Congress of Ethnobiology in Cusco, Peru, explicitly explored the Darrell A. Posey legacy in a session titled "Ethnobiology and Traditional Resource Rights: Darrell Posey's Legacy." This session celebrated Darrell Posey's many contributions and influences in the field of ethnobiology over the past several decades, both direct and indirect.

Following his death, Posey's executors donated a large collection of photographs and other papers relating to his Kayapó research to the Pitt Rivers Museum, University of Oxford. In 2017, the family of Posey donated artifacts and archival material belonging to Darrell to the Kentucky Historical Society located in Frankfort, Kentucky.

== Films and videos ==
- 1986. Special segment, Today Show/ NBC (USA) on Kayapó Indian Natural Resource Management; Lisa Freed, producer.
- 1987. Ciência dos Mebengokre, 2 - part video on ethnobiological knowledge of Kayapó Indians; made with TV GLOBO for "Globo Ciência" (Brazil); Marcia Sanchez, producer.
- 1988. Alternativos contra Destruição, 2 - part series for TV Manchete (Brazil) on Kayapó natural resource management; made for "Estação Ciência"; Ricardo Monte Rosa, producer.
- 1988. Without Borders, documentary film made for the United Nations on native peoples; CNN Productions (USA); Barbara Pyle, producer.
- 1988. Jungle Pharmacy, documentary film made for TV Trust for the Environment, Central TV (Britain) on medicinal plants used by native peoples; Herbert Girardet, producer.
- 1989. Xingú Encounter, a documentary film about the First Encounter of Indian Peoples in the Amazon, Floresta Films. Neville d'Almeida Director; D. A. Posey, text & narration.
- 1990. Kayapó Knowledge and the Future of the Amazon, a documentary film about the educational activities and aspects of the ethnobiological research project with the Kayapó Indians, De Campos Produçóes, Belém, Pará; text, narration, editing assistant and co-direction/ production.
- 1990. Altamira and After, a documentary of the Altamira Encounter and the subsequent activities of the indigenous groups of the Amazon in defense of their native lands and resources, De Campos Produções, Belém, Pará; text, narration, assistant editing and co-production.
- 1990. Will the Yanomami Survive?, De Campos Produções, Belém, Pará; text, narration, assistant editing and co-production.
- 1991. The Institute for Ethnobiology of the Amazon—INEA, a documentary about applied ethnobiological research in the Belém-based institute; De Campos Produções, Belém, Pará; text, narration, assistant editing and co-production.
- 1991. Natural Products and Green Consumerism, a film about "selling the tropical forest" and the problems that result; De Campos Produções, Belém, Pará; text, narration, assistant editing and co-production.
- 1991. Letter to the Kayapó, a film about the dangers of logging to indigenous peoples, and especially the Kayapó; Footprint Films, London; technical advisor.
- 1992. Earth Parliament, promotional film about the indigenous gathering for UNCED '92 in Rio de Janeiro; Foot Print Films, London; co-production.
- 1992. Amazon Knowledge, a documentary of the importance of traditional indigenous knowledge of Amazonian Indians, EMA Produções, Brasília, DF, Brazil; text, narration and assistant direction and editing.
- 1997. The Kayapo: 5 Years after the Earth Summit, CNN Documentary Productions (as scientific advisor & technical assistant).

== Selected writings ==
=== Books and edited volumes ===
- Posey, D. A. (1974). The Fifth Ward Settlement: a tri-racial marginal group. Unpublished M.A. thesis, Louisiana State University, Baton Rouge, Louisiana.
- Posey, D. A. (1979). Ethnoentomology of the Gorotire Kayapó of central Brazil. Unpublished Ph.D. thesis, University of Georgia, Athens, Georgia.
- Posey, D. A., et al. (1987). Alternativas à destruicão: ciência dos Mebengokre [Kayapó] . Belém, Brazil: Museu Paraense Emílio Goeldi. [Museum exhibit catalog]
- Posey, D. A., & Balée, W. L. (Eds.). (1989). Resource Management in Amazonia: Indigenous and Folk Strategies. (Advances in Economic Botany, 7). New York: New York Botanical Garden Press. ISBN 978-0-89327-340-8; ISBN 0-89327-340-6
- Posey, D. A., & Overal, W. L. (Eds.). (1990). Ethnobiology: Implications and Applications. Proceedings of the First International Congress of Ethnobiology, 1988. Belém, Brazil: Museu Paraense Emílio Goeldi. ISBN 85-7098-020-5; ISBN 978-85-7098-020-5
- Posey, D. A. (1995). Indigenous peoples and traditional resource rights: a basis for equitable relationships? . Oxford: Green College Centre for Environmental Policy and Understanding.
- Posey, D. A., Argumedo, A., da Costa e Silva, E., Dutfield, G., & Plenderleith, K. (1995). Indigenous peoples, traditional technologies and equitable sharing: international instruments for the protection of community intellectual property and traditional resource rights . Gland, Switzerland: International Union for the Conservation of Nature.
- Posey, D. A. (1996). Equitable Sharing of Benefits: International Instruments for the Protection of Community Intellectual Property and Traditional Resource Rights . The Hague: International Union for the Conservation of Nature/UNA, International Books.
- Posey, D. A. (1996). Provisions and mechanisms of the Convention on Biological Diversity for Access to Traditional Technologies and Benefit Sharing for Indigenous and Local Communities Embodying Traditional Lifestyles. (OCEES Research Paper, 6) . Oxford: Oxford Centre for the Environment, Ethics & Society. ISBN 1-900316-05-6
- Martin, G. A., Hoare, A. L., & Posey, D. A. (Eds.). (1996). Sources for Applying Ethnobotany to Conservation and Community Development: People and Plants Handbook. Paris: UNESCO, WWF & Kew Botanical Gardens.
- Pei Shengji, Su Yong-ge, Long Chun-lin, Marr, K., & Posey, D. A. (Eds.). (1996). The Challenges of Ethnobiology in the 21st Century: Proceedings of the Second International Congress of Ethnobiology. Kunming, China: Yunnan Science and Technology Press.
- Posey, D. A., Dutfield, G., Plenderleith, K., da Costa e Silva, E., & Argumedo, A. (1996). Traditional Resource Rights: International Instruments for Protection and Compensation for Indigenous Peoples and Local Communities . Gland: International Union for the Conservation of Nature. ISBN 2-8317-0355-7
- Posey, D. A., & Dutfield, G. (1996). Beyond Intellectual Property: Toward Traditional Resource Rights for Indigenous Peoples and Local Communities . Ottawa: International Development Research Centre. ISBN 0-88936-799-X; ISBN 978-0-88936-799-9
- Posey, D. A., & Dutfield, G. (1997). Indigenous peoples and sustainability: cases and actions . Utrecht: International Union for the Conservation of Nature and International Books.
- Posey, D. A. (Ed.). (1999). Cultural and Spiritual Values of Biodiversity. London: United Nations Environmental Programme & Intermediate Technology Publications. ISBN 1-85339-397-5; ISBN 1-85339-394-0
- Posey, D. A. (2002). Kayapo Ethnoecology and Culture . New York: Routledge. ISBN 978-0-415-27791-4
- Posey, D. A., & Vertovec, S. A. (Eds.). (2003). Globalization, Globalism, Environments, and Environmentalism: Consciousness of Connections (The Linacre Lectures). Oxford & New York: Oxford University Press. ISBN 978-0-19-926452-0; ISBN 0-19-926452-X
- Posey, D. A. (2004). Indigenous Knowledge and Ethics: A Darrell Posey Reader . New York: Routledge. ISBN 978-0-415-32363-5; ISBN 0-415-32363-0
- Posey, D. A., & Balick, M. J. (Eds.). (2006). Human Impacts on Amazonia: The Role of Traditional Ecological Knowledge in Conservation and Development. New York: Columbia University Press. ISBN 978-0-231-10588-0

=== Papers and book chapters ===
- Posey, D. A. (1976). Entomological considerations in Southeastern aboriginal demography. Ethnohistory, 23(2), 147–160.
- Posey, D. A. (1977). An ethnoentomological perspective of the Southeastern Indian belief system. Human Mosaic, 11(1), 1–10.
- Posey, D. A. (1978). Ethnoentomological survey of Amerind groups in lowland Latin America. The Florida Entomologist, 61(4), 225–229.
- Posey, D. A. (1978). Freejack lore and anomaly: a study of the Fifth Ward Settlement of southeastern Louisiana. Kroeber Anthropological Society Papers, 52, 66–71.
- Posey, D. A., Kerr, W. E., & Wolter Filho, W. (1978). Cupá, ou cipó-babão, alimento de alguns índios amazônicos. Acta Amazonica, 8(4), 702–705.
- Posey, D. A. (1979). Cisão dos Kayapó não impede crescimento populacional. Revista de Atualidade Indígena, 16(16), 52–58.
- Posey, D. A. (1979). Kayapo controla inseto com uso adequado do ambiente. Revista de Atualidade Indígena, 14, 47–58.
- Posey, D. A. (1979). Origin, development and maintenance of a Louisiana mixed-blood community: the ethnohistory of the Freejacks of the First Ward Settlement Journal of Ethnohistory, 26(2), 177–192.
- Posey, D. A. (1979). Pyka-tô-ti: Kayapó mostra a sua aldeia de origem. Revista de Atualidade Indígena, 3(14), 50–57.
- Posey, D. A. (1979). Social name and mixed-blood places: the Freejacks of the Fifth Ward Settlement. The Florida Anthropologist, 32(1), 8–16.
- Posey, D. A. (1979). The anthropologist and the Big Lips. The Rainbow, 103(3), 20–23.
- Posey, D. A. (1980). Algumas observaciones ethnoentomológicas sobre grupos Amerindos en la América Latina. América Indígena, 15(1), 105–120.
- Posey, D. A. (1981). Apicultura popular dos Kayapó. Revista de Atualidade Indígena, 20(1), 36–41.
- Posey, D. A. (1981). Ethnoentomology of the Kayapó Indians of central Brazil: wasps, warriors and fearless men. Journal of Ethnobiology, 1(1), 165–174.
- Posey, D. A. (1981). Language variation and ethnicity in an American tri-racial group. In S. Lander & K. Reah (Eds.), Aspects of Linguistic Variation: Proceedings of the Conference on Language Varieties (pp. 1–10). Sheffield, England: Centre for English Cultural Tradition and Language, University of Sheffield.
- Posey, D. A. (1981). The Kayapó origin of night. Journal of Latin American Indian Literatures, 5(2), 59–63.
- Posey, D. A. (1982). Keepers of the forest. New York Botanical Garden Magazine, 6(1), 18–24.
- Posey, D. A. (1982). Nomadic agriculture in the Amazon. New York Botanical Garden Magazine, 6(1), 18–24.
- Posey, D. A. (1982). The importance of bees to Kayapó Indians of the Brazilian Amazon. The Florida Entomologist, 65(4), 452–458.
- Posey, D. A. (1982). The journey of a Kayapó shaman. Journal of Latin American Indian Literatures, 6(3), 13–19.
- Posey, D. A. (1982). The Kayapó of the Brazilian Amazon. Carnegie Magazine (Carnegie Institute), 61(4), 18–23.
- Posey, D. A. (1982). Time, space and the interface of divergent cultures: the Kayapó Indians face the future. Revista Brasileira de Antropologia, 25, 89–104.
- Posey, D. A. (1983). Ethnomethodology as an emic guide to cultural systems: the case of the insects and the Kayapó Indians of Amazônia. Revista Brasileira de Zoologia, 1(3), 135–144.
- Posey, D. A. (1983). Folk apiculture of the Kayapó Indians of Brazil. Biotropica, 15(2), 154–158.
- Posey, D. A. (1983). Indigenous ecological knowledge and the development of the Amazon. In E. F. Moran (Ed.), The Dilemma of Amazonian Development (pp. 225–257). Boulder, Colorado: Westview Press.
- Posey, D. A. (1983). Indigenous knowledge and development: An ideological bridge to the future? Ciência e Cultura, 35(7), 877–894.
- Posey, D. A. (1983). Keeping of stingless bees by the Kayapó Indians of Brazil. Journal of Ethnobiology, 3(1), 63–73.
- Posey, D. A. (1983). O conhecimento Kayapó: etnometodologia e sistema cultural. Anuário Antropológico, 81, 109–121.
- Posey, D. A., Parker, E., da Silva, L. F., & Frechione, J. (1983). Resource exploitation in Amazônia: ethnoecological examples from four populations. Annals of the Carnegie Museum, 52(8), 163–203.
- Posey, D.A., Frechione, J., Eddins, J., Francelino Da Silva, L., Myers, D., Case, D. and Macbeath, P. (1984). Ethnoecology as applied anthropology in Amazonian development. Human Organization, 43(2), 95–107.
- Kerr, W. E., & Posey, D. A. (1984). Informações adicionais sobre an agricultura dos Kayapó. Interciência, 9(6), 392–400.
- Overal, W. L., & Posey, D. A. (1984). Uso de formigas do gênero Azteca para controle de saúvas entre os Caiapó do Brasil. Ciência e Cultura, 36(Suplemento), 935.
- Posey, D. A. (1984). A preliminary report on diversified management of the tropical forest by the Kayapó Indians of the Brazilian Amazon. In G. Prance (Ed.), Advances in Economic Botany (Vol. 1, pp. 112–116). New York: The New York Botanical Garden.
- Posey, D. A. (1984). Keepers of the campo. New York Botanical Garden Magazine, 8, 8–12,32.
- Posey, D. A. (1984). Os kayapó e a natureza. Ciência Hoje, 4(12), 36–41.
- Anderson, A. B., & Posey, D. A. (1985). Manejo de cerrado pelos índios Kayapó. Boletim do Museu Paraense Emílio Goeldi, Série Botânica, 2(1), 77–98.
- Posey, D. A. (1985). Ethnobiology: philosophy and methodology. Los Ensayistas, 18/19, 65–88.
- Posey, D. A. (1985). Indigenous management of tropical forest ecosystems: the case of the Kayapó Indians of the Brazilian Amazon. Agroforestry Systems, 3(2), 139–158.
- Posey, D. A. (1985). Native and indigenous guidelines for new Amazonian development strategies: understanding biological diversity through ethnoecology. In J. Hemming (Ed.), Change in the Amazon Basin (Vol. 1, pp. 156–180). Manchester, UK: Manchester University Press.
- Posey, D. A. (1985). Report from Gorotire: will Kayapó traditions survive? Focus, 7(4), 3.
- Posey, D. A., & Camargo, J. M. F. (1985). Additional notes on the classification and knowledge of stingless bees (Meliponinae, Apidae, Hymenoptera) by the Kayapó Indians of Gorotire, Pará, Brazil. Annals of Carnegie Museum, 54(8), 247–274.
- Elisabetsky, E., & Posey, D. A. (1986). Pesquisa etnofarmacológica e recursos naturais no trópico úmido: o caso dos índios Kayapó do Brasil e suas implicaçoes para a ciência médica. In Anais do Primeiro Simpósio do Trópico Úmido (Vol. 2, pp. 85–93). Belém, Brazil: Empresa Brasileira de Pesquisa Agropecuária, Centro de Pesquisa Agropecuária do Trópico Úmido.
- Posey, D. A. (1986). Concepts of health, illness, curing and death, in relation to medicinal plants and the appearance of the Messianic King on the Island of Lençois, Maranhão, Brazil. In E. Parker (Ed.), The Amazon Caboclo: Historical and Contemporary Perspectives (pp. 279–313). Williamsburg, Virginia: College of William and Mary.
- Posey, D. A. (1986). Etnobiologia: teoria e prática. In D. Ribeiro (Ed.), Suma Etnológica Brasileira (Vol. 1 (Etnobiologia), pp. 15–28). Petrópolis, Brazil: Vozes/FINEP.
- Posey, D. A. (1986). Etnoecologia e investigação do manejo dos recursos pelos índios Kayapó de Gorotire, Brasil (Ethnoecology and the investigation of resource management by the Kayapo Indians of Gorotire, Brazil). In Anais do Primeiro Simposio do Trópico Úmido (Vol. 6, pp. 63–70). Belém, Brazil: Empresa Brasileira de Pesquisa Agropecuária, Centro de Pesquisa Agropecuária do Trópico Úmido.
- Posey, D. A. (1986). Etnoentomologia dos tribos indígenas da Amazônia. In D. Ribeiro (Ed.), Suma Etnológica Brasileira (Vol. 1: Etnobiologia, pp. 251–272). Petrópolis, Brazil: Vozes/FINEP.
- Posey, D. A. (1986). Hypothesis generation and testing in ethnobiology and ethnoentomology: the "intellectual bridge" between science and cultures. In Proceedings of the 10th International Congress of the International Union for the Study of Social Insects (August 18–22, 1986). Munich: Springer Verlag.
- Posey, D. A. (1986). Introduçao. Etnobiologia: teoria e prática. In D. Ribeiro (Ed.), Suma Etnológica Brasileira. Vol. 1. Etnobiologia (pp. 15–25). Petrópolis, Rio de Janeiro: Vozes/FINEP.
- Posey, D. A. (1986). Manejo da floresta secundária, capoeiras, campos e cerrados (Kayapó). In D. Ribeiro (Ed.), Suma Etnológica Brasileira (Vol. 1 (Etnobiologia), pp. 173–188). Petrópolis, Rio de Janeiro: Vozes/FINEP.
- Posey, D. A. (1986). Temas e inquirições em etnoentomologia: algumas sugestões quanto à geração e teste de hipóteses. Boletim do Museu Paraense Emílio Goeldi, Série Antropologia, 2(2), 99–134.
- Posey, D. A. (1986). Topics and issues in ethnoentomology, with some suggestions for the development of hypothesis generation and testing in ethnobiology. Journal of Ethnobiology, 6(1), 99–120.
- Posey, D. A., & Elisabetsky, E. (1986). Pesquisa etnofarmacológica e recursos naturais no Trópico Umido: o caso dos índios Kayapó e suas implicações para a ciência médica. In Primeiro Simpósio do Trópico Umido (pp. 85–93). Belém, Brazil: Empresa Brasileira de Pesquisa Agropecuária, Centro de Pesquisa Agropecuária do Trópico Úmido.
- Anderson, A. B., & Posey, D. A. (1987). Índios e a natureza: reflorestamento indígena. Ciência Hoje, 6(31), 44–51.
- Anderson, A. B., & Posey, D. A. (1987). Reflorestamento indígena. Ciência Hoje, 6(31), 44–50.
- Posey, D. A. (1987). An ethnoentomological survey of Brazilian Indians. Entomologia Generalis, 12(2-3), 190–202.
- Posey, D. A. (1987). Contact before contact: typology of post-Columbian interaction with the Northern Kayapó of the Amazon Basin. Boletim do Museu Paraense Emílio Goeldi, Série Antropologia, 3(2), 135–154.
- Posey, D. A. (1987). Etnobiologia como uma ciência aplicada e seu papel na criaçao de novos modelos para conservação na Amazônia. In G. Kohlhepp (Ed.), Homem e Natureza na Amazônia. Tübingen: Geographisches Institut, Universität Tübingen.
- Posey, D. A. (1987). Etnobiologia e ciência de folk: sua importância para a Amazônia. Tübinger Geographische Studien, 95, 95–108.
- Posey, D. A. (1987). Etnobiologia y ciencia "folk": su importancia para la Amazonía. Hombre y Ambiente: El punto da vista indígena, 1(4), 2-26.
- Posey, D. A. (1984). Hierarchy and utility in a folk biological taxonomic system: patterns in classification of arthropods by the Kayapó Indians of Brazil. Journal of Ethnobiology, 4(2), 123–139.
- Posey, D. A. (1987). Temas e inquirições em etnoentomologia: algumas sugestões quanto à geração e teste de hipóteses. Boletim do Museu Paraense Emílio Goeldi, Série Antropologia, 3(2), 99–134.
- Posey, D. A. (1988). Effects of deforestation on the Kayapó Indians in relation to loss of traditional knowledge and disruption of indigenous ecological management practices. In 46th International Congress of Americanists' Conference on Amazonia: Deforestation and Possible Effects, Abstracts (pp. 12–13). Amsterdam.
- Posey, D. A. (1988). El desarrollo de productos naturales y la cuestion de la propiedad intelectual de las communidades indigenas en el Brasil y América Latina. In H.-J. Koenig (Ed.), El índio como sujeto y objeto de la historia latinoamericana. Frankfurt am Main & Madrid.
- Posey, D. A. (1988). Etnobiologia: a ciência de folk. In Anais do Simpósio sobre Tendência dos Recursos da Amazônia. Madrid: Comissão Real do 500 Aniversário do Descobrimento das Américas.
- Posey, D. A. (1988). Kayapó Indian natural resource management. In J. S. Denslow & C. Padoch (Eds.), People of the Tropical Rain Forest (pp. 89–90). Berkeley: Smithsonian Institution Travelling Exhibition Service & University of California.
- Posey, D. A. (1988). Los Kayapó e la naturaleza. Hombre y Ambiente: El punto da vista indígena, 2(5), 79–94.
- Posey, D. A. (1988). Resource management by the Kayapó, Brazil. In J. Gradwohl & R. Greenberg (Eds.), Saving the Tropical Forests (pp. 123–125). London: Earthscan Publications.
- Posey, D. A., & Anderson, A. B. (1988). Reforestación indígena. Hombre y Ambiente: El punto da vista indígena, 2(5), 67–77.
- Anderson, A. B., & Posey, D. A. (1989). Management of a tropical scrub savanna by the Gorotire Kayapó of Brazil. In D. A. Posey & W. L. Balée (Eds.), Resource Management in Amazonia: Indigenous and Folk Strategies. (Advances in Economic Botany, 7) (pp. 159–173). New York: New York Botanical Garden.
- Elisabetsky, E., & Posey, D. A. (1989). Use of contraceptive and related plants by the Kayapó Indians (Brazil). Journal of Ethnopharmacology, 26, 299–316.
- Hecht, S. B., & Posey, D. A. (1989). Preliminary findings on soil management of the Kayapó Indians. In D. A. Posey & W. L. Balée (Eds.), Resource Management in Amazônia: Indigenous and Folk Strategies (pp. 174–188). New York: New York Botanical Garden.
- Posey, D. A. (1989). Alternatives to forest destruction: lessons from the Mebengokre. The Ecologist, 19(6), 241–244.
- Posey, D. A. (1989). From warclubs to words. NACLA, 23(1), 13–19.
- Posey, D. A. (1989). Medicinas alternativas. Revista da Sociedade Brasileria de História da Ciência, 4, 64–67.
- Posey, D. A. (1989). The culture of Amazonian forests. In D. A. Posey & W. L. Balée (Eds.), Resource Management in Amazonia: Indigenous and Folk Strategies. New York: New York Botanical Garden.
- Posey, D. A. (1989). The Kayapó: on trial for speaking out. Index on Censorship, 18(6-7), 16–20.
- Posey, D. A., & Elisabetsky, E. (1989). Additional notes on contraceptive and related fertility plants used by the Kayapó Indians. In D. A. Posey & W. L. Balée (Eds.), Resource Management in Amazonia: Indigenous and Folk Strategies. New York: New York Botanical Garden.
- Posey, D. A., Frechione, J., & da Silva, L. F. (1989). The perception of ecological zones and natural resources in the Brazilian Amazon: an ethnoecology of Lake Coari. In D. A. Posey & W. L. Balée (Eds.), Resource Management in Amazônia: Indigenous and Folk Strategies. New York: New York Botanical Garden.
- Camargo, J. M. F., & Posey, D. A. (1990). O conhecimento dos Kayapó sobre as abelhas sociais sem ferrão (Meliponinae, Apidae, Hymenoptera): notas adicionais. Boletim de Museu Paraense Emílio Goeldi, Série Zoologia, 6(1), 17–42.
- Overal, W. L., & Posey, D. A. (1990). Uso de formigas Azteca para controle biológico de pragas agricolas entre os Indios Kayapó do Brasil Central. In D. A. Posey & W. L. Overal (Eds.), Ethnobiology: Implications and Applications. Proceedings of the First International Congress of Ethnobiology (Vol. 2, pp. 219–226). Belém, Brazil: Museu Paraense Emílio Goeldi.
- Posey, D. A. (1990). Cultivating the forests of the Amazon: science of the Mebengokre. Orion Nature Quarterly, 9 (3), 16–23.
- Posey, D. A. (1990). Intellectual property rights and just compensation for indigenous knowledge. Anthropology Today, 6(4), 13–16.
- Posey, D. A. (1990). Intellectual property rights: what is the position of ethnobiology? Journal of Ethnobiology, 10, 93–98.
- Posey, D. A. (1990). Introduction to ethnobiology: its Implications and applications. In D. A. Posey & W. L. Overal (Eds.), Ethnobiology: Implications and Applications. Proceedings of the First International Congress of Ethnobiology (Vol. 1, pp. 1–8). Belém: Museu Paraense Emílio Goeldi.
- Posey, D. A. (1990). The application of ethnobiology in the conservation of dwindling natural resources: lost knowledge or options for the survival of the planet. In D. A. Posey & W. L. Overal (Eds.), Ethnobiology: Implications and Applications. Proceedings for the First International Congress of Ethnobiology (pp. 47–61). Belém, Brazil: Museu Paraense Emílio Goeldi.
- Posey, D. A. (1990). The science of the Mebengokre. Orion, 1990(Summer), 16–23.
- Posey, D. A., & Anderson, A. B. (1990). O reflorestamento indígena. In G. Bologna (Ed.), Amazônia Adeus. Rio de Janeiro: Ed. Nova Fronteira.
- Posey, D. A., & Hecht, S. B. (1990). Indigenous soil management in the Latin American tropics: some implications for the Amazon Basin. In D. A.Posey & W. L. Overal (Eds.), Ethnobiology: implications and applications. Proceedings for the First International Congress of Ethnobiology (Belém, Pará). Belém: Museu Paraense Emílio Goeldi.
- Posey, D. A. (1991 (1995)). Ethnobiology in defense of indigenous peoples. Louisiana Archaeology, 18, 101–112.
- Kerr, W. E., & Posey, D. A. (1991). "Kangàrà kanê" Tanaecium nocturnum (Bignoniaceae), um cipó usado pelos índios Kayapó como inseticida natural. Acta Amazonica, 7(1), 23–26.
- Posey, D. A. (1991). Effecting international change. Cultural Survival Quarterly, Summer, 29–35.
- Posey, D. A. (1991). Importance of semi-domesticated species in post-contact Amazonia: effects of Kayapó Indian dispersal of flora and fauna of the region. In Résumés des Communications, International Symposium on Food and Nutrition in the Tropical Forest: Biocultural Interactions and Applications to Development. Paris: UNESCO.
- Posey, D. A. (1991). Intellectual property rights for native peoples: a Pandora's box for those seeking alternatives. In Proceedings of the 8th International Federation of Organic Agricultural Movements. Budapest: IFOAM.
- Posey, D. A. (1991). Rechte der indigenen Völker. Capivara: Regenwaldmagazin der Greenpeace, 1, 2–6.
- Posey, D. A., & Anderson, A. B. (1991). Reflorestamento indígena. Ciência Hoje, ("Special on Amazôna"), 6–13.
- Posey, D. A., & Elisabetsky, E. (1991). Conceitos de animais e seus espíritos em relação a doenças e curas entre os índios Kayapó da aldeia Gorotire, Pará. Boletim do Museu Paraense Emílio Goeldi, Série Antropologia, 7(1), 21–36.
- Posey, D. A., & Kerr, W. E. (1991). Kangàrà kane: a vine that kills bees. International Bee World.
- Posey, D. A. (1992). Reply to Parker. American Anthropologist, 94(2), 441–443.
- Posey, D. A. (1992). Das Wissen der Mebengokre. Kosmos 7, 63–69.
- Posey, D. A. (1992). Die Wissenschaft der Kayapó. In J. Bogenreiter & R. Trink (Eds.), Unser Amerika: 500 Jahre Indianischer (pp. 223–233). Wien: Jugend und Volk.
- Posey, D. A. (1992). Etnobiologia e etno-desenvolvimento: importância da experiência dos povos tradicionais. In Simdamazonia: Anais do Seminário Internacional sobre Meio Ambiente, Pobreza e Desenvolvimento (pp. 112–118). Belém, Brazil: PRODEPA.
- Posey, D. A. (1992). Indigenous peoples and conservation: traditional knowledge and new models for the future. In H. Hoigawa, Y. Sugiyama, G. P. Sackett & R. K. R. Thompson (Eds.), Topics in Primatology: Behavior, Ecology and Conservation. Proceedings of the XIII Congress of the International Primatological Society (Vol. 2, pp. 329–341). Tokyo: University of Tokyo.
- Posey, D. A. (1992). Indigenous peoples and the conservation of biodiversity. In Common Vision: Program Report (pp. 14–16).
- Posey, D. A. (1992). Interpreting and applying the "reality" of indigenous concepts: what is necessary to learn from the natives? In K. H. Redford & C. Padoch (Eds.), Conservation of Neotropical Forests: working from traditional resource use (pp. 21–34). New York: Columbia University Press. ISBN 0-231-07603-7
- Posey, D. A. (1992). Introduction to the relevance of indigenous knowledge. In A. E. Oliveira & D. Hamú (Eds.), Kayapó Science: Alternatives to Destruction (pp. 15–18). Belém, Brazil: Museu Paraense Emílio Goeldi.
- Posey, D. A. (1992). Kayapó Indianen, Experts in Synergie. Tribaal Nieuws: Inheemse Volken, Mieieu en Onwikkeling, 6, 10–15.
- Posey, D. A. (1992). Kayapó Science: Alternatives to Destruction. In A. E. Oliveira & D. Hamú (Eds.), Kayapó Science: Alternatives to Destruction (pp. 19–43). Belém, Brazil: Museu Paraense Emílio Goeldi.
- Posey, D. A. (1992). People of the fallows: a historical ecology of foraging in lowland South America. In K. H. Redford & C. Padoch (Eds.), Conservation of Neotropical Forests: working from traditional resource use (pp. 21–34). New York: Columbia University Press. ISBN 0-231-07603-7
- Posey, D. A. (1992). Scienza indigena. In R. Coravaggi (Ed.), Biodiversita (pp. 28–37). Rome: Dimensione Energie.
- Posey, D. A. (1992). The relation between cultural diversity and biodiversity. In S. Bilderbeek (Ed.), Biodiversity and International Law (pp. 44–47). Amsterdam: IOS Press.
- Posey, D. A. (1992). The science of the Mebengokre. In Finding Home. Boston: Beacon Press.
- Posey, D. A. (1992). Traditional knowledge, conservation and "the rainforest harvest". In M. J. Plotkin & L. Famolare (Eds.), Sustainable Harvest and Marketing of Rainforest Products (pp. 46–51). Washington: Island Press. ISBN 1-55963-169-4
- Posey, D. A. (1992). Ways and means of strengthening sustainable and environmentally sound self-development of indigenous peoples. In Report of the United Nations Technical Conference on Practical Experience in the Realization of Sustainable and Environmentally Sound Self-development of Indigenous Peoples (Santiago, Chile, May 18–22, 1992).. Santiago, Chile: U.N. Doc. E/CN.4/Sub.2/1992/31/Add.1, May 25, 1992.
- Posey, D. A., & Suchanek, N. (1992). Das Ueberlegene Wissen der Kayapó-Indianer. Journal für Musse und Gesundheit, 3, 34–38.
- Posey, D. A. (1993). Das Konnen der Kayapó: Nutzung und Schutz zugleich. In A. Suchantke (Ed.), Partnerschaft mit der Natur. Stuttgart: Verlag Urachhaus.
- Posey, D. A. (1993). Indigenous knowledge in the conservation and use of world forests. In K. Ramikrisha & G. Woodwell (Eds.), World Forests for the Future: Their Use and Conservation (pp. 59–77). New Haven & London: Yale University Press.
- Posey, D. A. (1993). Intellectual property rights and just compensation for indigenous knowledge. In M. Bothe, T. Kurzidem & C. Schmidt (Eds.), Amazonia and Siberia: Legal Aspects of the Preservation of the Environment and Development in the Last Open Spaces. International Environmental Law and Policy Series. Holland: Graham & Trotman/Martinus Nijhoff.
- Posey, D. A. (1993). The importance of semi-domesticated species in post-contact Amazonia: effects of Kayapó Indian dispersal on flora and fauna. Man and the Biosphere Series. In C. Hladik, H. Pagezy, O. Linares, A. Hladik & H. Hadley (Eds.), Tropical Forests, People and Food (Vol. Man and the Biosphere, v. 13, pp. 63–72). Paris: UNESCO and Parthenon.
- Posey, D. A. (1993). Wild foods and non-timber products in biodiversity conservation: problems with intellectual property rights for indigenous peoples. In Proceedings of the Symposium: Intellectual Property Rights, Indigenous Cultures and Biodiversity Conservation. Oxford: Green College Centre for Environmental Policy and Understanding.
- Yamin, F., & Posey, D. A. (1993). Indigenous peoples, biotechnology and intellectual property rights. Review of European Community and International Environmental Law, 2(2), 141–148.
- Elisabetsky, E., & Posey, D. A. (1994). Ethnopharmacological search for anti-viral compounds: treatment of gastrointestinal disorders by Kayapó medical specialists. In Ciba Foundation Symposium 185. Ethnobotany and the Search for New Drugs (pp. 77–94). Chichester, UK: John Wiley and Sons.
- Posey, D. A. (1994). Bioprospecting and indigenous knowledge systems In V. Shiva (Ed.), Biodiversity Conservation: Whose Resource? Whose Knowledge? (pp. 243–247). New Delhi: INTAC.
- Posey, D. A. (1994). Será que o "consumismo verde" vai salvar an Amazônia e seu habitantes? . In M. A. d'Incão & I. M. d. Silveira (Eds.), A Amazonia e a Crise da Modernizacão (pp. 345–361). Belém, Brazil: Museu Paraense Emílio Goeldi.
- Posey, D. A. (1994). Conseqüências ecológicas da presença do índio Kayapó na Amazônia: recursos antropológicos e direitos de recursos tradicionais. In C. Cavalcanti (Ed.), Desenvolvimento e Natureza; Estudos para uma sociedade sustentável. Recife: Instituto de Pesquisas Sociais, Fundacao Joaquim Nabuco.
- Posey, D. A. (1994). Environmental and social implications of pre- and postcontact situations on Brazilian Indians: the Kayapó and a new Amazonian synthesis. In A. C. Roosevelt (Ed.), Amazonian Indians from Prehistory to the Present: Anthropological Perspectives (pp. 271–286). Tucson: University of Arizona Press. ISBN 0-8165-1821-1
- Posey, D. A. (1994). International agreements and intellectual property right protection for indigenous peoples. In T. Greaves (Ed.), Intellectual Property Rights for Indigenous Peoples: A Source Book (pp. 223–252). Oklahoma City, Oklahoma: Society for Applied Anthropology. ISBN 0-9642023-0-1; ISBN 978-0-9642023-0-6
- Posey, D. A. (1994). International agreements for protecting indigenous knowledge. In V. Sanchez & C. Juma (Eds.), Biodiplomacy: genetic resources and international relations (pp. 119–137). Nairobi, Kenya: African Centre for Technology Studies.
- Posey, D. A. (1994). International agreements for the protection of indigenous knowledge. In Biodiplomacy: Genetic Resources and International Relations. Nairobi: UNEP/African Centre for Technology Studies, ACTS Press.
- Posey, D. A. (1994). Introduction to intellectual, cultural and scientific property rights for indigenous peoples. In Voices of the Earth: Indigenous Peoples, New Partners, the Right to Self-Determination in Practice (pp. 217–239). Amsterdam: Dutch Society for Indigenous Peoples.
- Posey, D. A. (1994). Kulturelle und Wissenschaftlich Aspekte. In Reader: Pacha Mama. Internationaler Kongress zur Situation Indigener Volker in Lateinamerika. Berlin: Deutscher Entwicklungsdienst Gemeinnutzige/Haus der Kulturen der Welt (Berlin).
- Posey, D. A. (1994). Traditional resource rights (TRR): de facto self-determination for indigenous peoples. In L. van der Vlist (Ed.), Voices of the Earth: Indigenous Peoples, New Partners & the Right to Self-determination in Practice (pp. 217–235). Amsterdam: The Netherlands Centre for Indigenous Peoples.
- Posey, D. A. (1995). Indigenous knowledge and green consumerism: co-operation or conflict? In T. Wakeford & M. Walters (Eds.), Science for the Earth: Can Science Make the World a Better Place?. London: John Wiley & Sons.
- Posey, D. A., & Kabuye, C. (1995). Conservation enhancement: indigenous peoples and local communities. In Nairobi: Working Paper No. 24. Geneva: International Academy of the Environment.
- Posey, D. A., Dutfield, G., & Plenderleith, K. (1995). Collaborative research and intellectual property rights. Biodiversity and Conservation, 4(8), 892–902.
- D'Olne Campos, M., & Posey, D. A. (1996). Mêbengokrê cosmology and calendar: an ethnoecological approach from Gorotire Kayapó Indians of the Brazilian Amazon Basin. In Pei Shengji, Su Yong-ge, Long Chun-lin, K. Marr & D. A. Posey (Eds.), The Challenges of Ethnobiology in the 21st Century: Proceedings of the Second International Congress of Ethnobiology. Kunming, China: Yunnan Science and Technology Press.
- Overal, W. L., & Posey, D. A. (1996). Práticas agrícolas dos índios Kayapó do Pará: subsídios para o desenvolvimento da Amazônia. In C. Pavan (Ed.), Amazônia: Uma Estratégia Latino-Americana para a Amazônia (Vol. 1). Brasília: Ministério do Meio Ambiente, dos Recursos Hídricos e da Amazônia Legal & Unesp.
- Posey, D. A. (1996). Diachronic ecotones and anthropogenic landscapes in Amazonia: contesting the consciousness of conservation. In W. L. Balée (Ed.), Advances in Historical Ecology (pp. 104–118). New York: Columbia University Press. ISBN 978-0-231-10632-0; ISBN 0-231-10632-7
- Posey, D. A. (1996). Forum: Finders keepers won't do any more. New Scientist, 2038, 48.
- Posey, D. A. (1996). Indigenous knowledge, biodiversity, and international rights: learning about forests from the Kayapó Indians of the Brazilian Amazon. The Commonwealth Forestry Review, 76(1), 53–60.
- Posey, D. A. (1996). Memories of William G. Haag. Louisiana Archaeology, 18, 213–214.
- Posey, D. A. (1996). Ethnobiologists: victims or villains in the intellectual property rights dilemma. In V. Sandoval (Ed.), Ethnobiology: New Takes. Athens: University of Georgia Press.
- Posey, D. A. (1996). Ethnobiology and ethnodevelopment: importance of traditional knowledge and traditional peoples. In Pei Shengji, Su Yong-ge, Long Chun-lin, K. Marr & D. A. Posey (Eds.), The Challenges of Ethnobiology in the 21st Century: Proceedings of the Second International Congress of Ethnobiology (pp. 7–13). Kunming, China: Yunnan Science and Technology Press.
- Posey, D. A. (1996). Implementing traditional resource rights. In Making Forest Policy Work (pp. 33–38). Oxford: Oxford Forestry Institute/IIED, SGS Forestry/ANU.
- Posey, D. A. (1996). Os povos tradicionais e a conservação da biodiversidade. In C. Pavan (Ed.), Amazônia: uma estratégia latino-americana para a Amazônia (Vol. 1, pp. 149–157). Brasília: Ministério do Meio Ambiente, dos Recursos Hídricos e da Amazônia Legal & Editora da Universidade Estadual de São Paulo.
- Posey, D. A. (1996). Problem einer globalen Umwelt- und Entwicklungs-Strategie. In W. Pieper (Ed.), Copyright oder Copywrong: Geistiges Eigentum, kulturelles Erbe und wirtschaftlich Ausbeutung (pp. 31–40). Lohrbach: Der Grune Zweig.
- Posey, D. A. (1996). Protecting indigenous peoples' rights to biodiversity. Environment, 38(8), 6–9, 37–45.
- Posey, D. A. (1996). The Kayapó Indian protests against Amazonian dams: successes, alliances and un-ending battles. In C. McDowell (Ed.), Understanding Impoverishment: The Consequences of Development-Induced Displacement, Refugee and Forced Migration Studies (Vol. 2). Providence & Oxford: Berghahn Books.
- Posey, D. A. (1996). The Kayapó Indian protests against Amazonian dams: successes, alliances, and un-ending battles. In Resisting Impoverishment: Tackling the Consequences of Development-Induced Displacement. Oxford: Berghahn Books.
- Posey, D. A., Dutfield, G., Plenderleith, K., Willard, T., & Mcfall, S. (1996). Indigenous Peoples and Farmers: Part A: Identifying Commonalities and Divergencies Between Indigenous Peoples and Farmers' Groups: GRAIN.
- Posey, D. A. (1997). Wider use and application of indigenous knowledge, innovations, and practices: information systems and ethical concerns. In D. L. Hawksworth, P. M. Kirk & S. Dextre Clarke (Eds.), Biodiversity Information: Needs and Options. Wallingford & New York: CAB International, IUBS, IUCN, IUFRO.
- Posey, D. A. (1997). Can Kayapó management strategies be equitably utilized and applied?: utilizing Amazonian indigenous knowledge in the conservation of biodiversity. In Cross-Cultural Protection of Nature and the Environment. Denmark: Odense University Press.
- Posey, D. A. (1997). Ecological consequences of Kayapó Indian presence in Amazonia: anthropogenic resources and traditional resource rights. In C. Cavalcanti (Ed.), A Economia da Sustentabilidade: Princípios, Desafios, Aplicacões. Recife, Brazil: Fundacao Joaquim Nabuco.
- Posey, D. A. (1997). Exploração da biodiversidade e do conhecimento indígena na América Latina: desafios à soberania e à velha ordem. In C. Cavalcanti (Ed.), Meio ambiente, desenvolvimento sustentável e políticas públicas (pp. 345–368). São Paulo & Recife Cortez & Fundação Joaquim Nabuco.
- Posey, D. A. (1997). Identifizierung und Respektierung der Grenzen zwischen indigenen Volkern, traditionellen Bauren und ortlichen Gemeinschaften. In E. U. von Weizsacker (Ed.), Grenzen-los? Jedes System braucht Grenzen-aber wie durchlassig mussen diesse sein?. Berlin: Birkhauser Verlag.
- Posey, D. A. (1997). Utilising Amazonian indigenous knowledge in the conservation of biodiversity: can Kayapó management strategies be equitably utilised and applied? In F. Arler & I. Svennevig (Eds.), Cross-Cultural Protection of Nature and the Environment. Denmark: University of Odense. ISBN 87-7838-347-1
- Posey, D. A. (1998). The "balance sheet" and the "sacred balance": valuing the knowledge of indigenous and traditional peoples. Worldviews: Environment, Culture, Religion, 2, 91–106.
- Posey, D. A. (1998). Indigenous peoples and their knowledge: missing links and lost knowledge in the conservation of Brazil's tropical forests. In R. J. Hoag & K. Moran (Eds.), Culture: The Missing Element in Conservation and Development. Washington, D.C.: National Zoological Park/Smithsonian Institution. 0787247618
- Posey, D. A. (1998). Indigenous peoples: missing links and lost knowledge in the conservation of Brazil's tropical forests. In R. J. Hoage & K. Moran (Eds.), Culture: The Missing Element in Conservation and Development. Washington, D.C. & Dubuque, Iowa: National Zoological Park/Smithsonian Institution & Kendall/Hunt Publishing Company.
- Posey, D. A. (1998). Safeguarding traditional resource rights of indigenous peoples. In V. D. Nazarea (Ed.), Ethnoecology: Situated Knowledge/Located Lives (pp. 217–230). Tucson: Arizona University Press.
- Posey, D. A. (1998). Traditional ecological knowledge and the "web of life": rediscovering the cultural and spiritual values of biodiversity. In H. Niec (Ed.), Cultural Rights & Wrongs: A Collection of Essays in Commemoration of the 50th Anniversary of the Universal Declaration of Human Rights. Paris: UNESCO & University of Leicester: Institute of Art and Law.
- Posey, D. A., & Dutfield, G. (1998). Plants, patents and traditional knowledge: ethical concerns of indigenous and traditional peoples. In G. v. Overwalle (Ed.), Patent Law, Ethics and Biotechnology (pp. 109–132). Brussels, Belgium: Bruylant.
- Posey, D. A. (1999). Developing sui generis options for the protection of living aquatic resources of indigenous and local communities. In R. S. V. Pullin, D. M. Bartley & J. Kooiman (Eds.), Towards Policies for Conservation and Sustainable Use of Aquatic Genetic Resources (pp. 187–206). Rome, Italy: FAO/ICLARM.
- Posey, D. A. (1999). Cultural and spiritual values of biodiversity: a complementary contribution to the Global Biodiversity Assessment. In D. A. Posey (Ed.), Cultural and Spiritual Values of Biodiversity (pp. 1–19). London: United Nations Environmental Programme & Intermediate Technology Publications.
- Laird, S. A., Alexiades, M. N., Bannister, K., & Posey, D. (2000). The publication of biodiversity research results and the flow of knowledge, professional society standards for biodiversity research: codes of ethics and research guidelines. In S. A. Laird (Ed.), Biodiversity and Traditional Knowledge: Equitable Partnerships in Practice (pp. Chapter 5): Earthscan Publications.
- Posey, D. A. (2000). Beyond the Big Lips. Resurgence Magazine, 2000(203). On-line.
- Posey, D. A. (2000). Biodiversity, genetic resources and indigenous peoples in Amazonia: (re)discovering the wealth of traditional resources of native Amazonians. In A. Hall (Ed.), Amazônia at the Crossroads: The Challenge of Sustainable Development (pp. 188–204). London: Institute for Latin American Studies, University of London.
- Posey, D. A. (2000). Commercialization of traditional knowledge: practical and ethical considerations. In J. Grim (Ed.), Indigenous Religions and Biodiversity Conservation. Cambridge, Massachusetts: Harvard Center for the Study of World Religions.
- Posey, D. A. (2000). Commodification of the sacred through intellectual property rights. Journal of Ethnopharmacology.
- Posey, D. A. (2000). Culture and nature: the inextricable link. The Ecologist.
- Posey, D. A. (2000). Ethnobiology and ethnoecology in the context of national laws and international agreements affecting indigenous and local knowledge, traditional resources and intellectual property rights. In R. Ellen, P. Parkes & A. Bicker (Eds.), Indigenous Environmental Knowledge and its transformations. Critical Anthropological Perspectives (pp. 35–54). London: Routledge. ISBN 90-5702-484-5
- Posey, D. A. (2000). Exploitation of biodiversity and indigenous knowledge in Latin America: challenges to sovereignty and the old order. In C. Cavalcanti (Ed.), The Environment, Sustainable Development and Public Policies: Building Sustainability in Brazil (pp. 186–209). Cheltenham, UK: Edward Elgar Press.
- Posey, D. A. (2000). Selling Grandma: commodification of the sacred. In D. Shankar (Ed.), Conservation of Medicinal Plants. Bangalore, India: Institute for the Revitalization of Traditional Health.
- Posey, D. A., & Overal, W. L. (2000). Social insects and the Kayapó Indians of the Brazilian Amazon: indigenous appreciation and nomenclature of biodiversity. In Proceedings of the International Congress of Entomology.
- Laird, S. A., & Posey, D. A. (2001). Professional society standards for biodiversity research: codes of ethics and research guidelines. In S. A. Laird (Ed.), Biodiversity and Traditional Knowledge: Equitable Partnerships in Practice (pp. Chapter 3). London: Earthscan Publications. ISBN 1-85383-698-2
- Posey, D. A. (2001). Biological and cultural diversity: the inextricable, linked by language and politics [Electronic Version]. Terralingua from http://www.terralingua.org/.
- Posey, D. A. (2001). Biological and cultural diversity: the inextricable, linked by language and politics. In L. Maffi (Ed.), On Biocultural Diversity: Linking Language, Knowledge, and the Environment (pp. 379–396). Washington, D.C.: Smithsonian Institution Press.
- Posey, D. A. (2001). Cultural landscapes. In C. R. Elevitch (Ed.), The Overstory Book: Cultivating Connections with Trees (2 ed., pp. 17–19). Holualoa, Hawaii: Permanent Agriculture Resources. ISBN 0-9702544-3-1
- Posey, D. A. (2002). Commodification of the sacred through intellectual property rights. Journal of Ethnopharmacology, 83(1-2), 3–12.
- Posey, D. A. (2002). Selling Grandma: commodification of the sacred through intellectual property rights. In E. Barkan & R. Bush (Eds.), Claiming the Stones/Naming the Bones: Cultural Property and the Negotiation of National and Ethnic Identity. Los Angeles: Getty Research Institute.
- Posey, D. A. (2002). Upsetting the sacred balance: can the study of indigenous knowledge reflect cosmic connectedness? In P. Sillitoe, A. Bicker & J. Pottier (Eds.), Participating in Development: Approaches to Indigenous Knowledge (pp. 24–42). New York: Routledge. ISBN 0-415-25868-5
- Posey, D. A. (2003). Fragmenting cosmic connections: converting nature into commodity. In S. A. Vertovec & D. A. Posey (Eds.), Globalization, Globalism, Environments, and Environmentalism: Consciousness of Connections (The Linacre Lectures) (pp. 123–140). Oxford: Oxford University Press.
- Posey, D. A. (2003). Insects, foods, medicines and folklore in Amazonia. In E. Motte-Florac & J. M. C. Thomas (Eds.), Les "Insectes" Dans La Tradition Orale - Insects in Oral Literature and Tradition (pp. 221–237). Paris: Peeters Publishers. ISBN 90-429-1307-X

=== Book reviews ===
- Posey, D. A. (1980). (Review of) Folk Literature of the Gê Indians (Wilbert). American Anthropologist, 82(3), 608.
- Posey, D. A. (1988). (Review of) Pharmacopées traditionnelles en Guyane: Créoles, Palikur, Wayäpi (Grenand, Moretti, and Jacquemin). Collection mémoires No. 108. Paris: Orstrom. Interciencia 13(6), 328.
- Posey, D. A. (1989). (Review of) Pharmacopées traditionnelles en Guyane: Créoles, Palikur, Wayäpi (Grenand, Moretti, and Jacquemin). Collection mémoires No. 108. Paris: Orstrom. Journal of Ethnobiology.
- Posey, D. A. (1990). (Review of) Amazon Frontier: The Defeat of the Brazilian Indians (John Hemming). Cambridge, Massachusetts: Harvard University Press. Journal of Forest History Society, 34(3), 145.
- Posey, D. A. (1994). (Review of) In the Society of Nature (Philippe Descola), Cambridge University Press. Journal of Applied Ecology.
- Posey, D. A. (1994). (Review of) The Ecology of Choice and Symbol: Essays in Honour of Fredrik Barth, Eds. Reidar Gronhaug, Gunnar Haaland, & Gerog Hendriksen. 1991, Bergen, Norway: Alma Mater Forlag. Man.
- Posey, D. A. (1995). (Review of the film) The Journey Back. Directed by Peter Elsass, Produced by the Danish National Film Board. Visual Anthropology, 7(4), 281–282.
- Posey, D. A. (1995). (Review of) A Amazônia e a Crise da Modernizacão (eds. Maria Angela d'Incão & Isolda Silveira), Museu Paraense Emilio Goeldi/CNPq. Journal of Latin American Studies, 27, 487–488.
- Posey, D. A. (1995). (Review of) Footprints of the Forest (William L. Balee), Columbia University Press. Times Literary Supplement, 4809 (June 2).
- Posey, D. A. (1995). (Review of) Footprints of the Forest (William L. Balée), Columbia University Press. Journal of Ethnobiology, 15(1), 154–155.
- Posey, D. A. (1995). (Review of) In the Society of Nature (Philippe Descola), Cambridge University Press. Journal of Ethnobiology, 15(1), 155–156.
- Posey, D. A. (1996). (Review of) The Spirit of the Soil: Agriculture and Environmental Ethics, Paul Thompson (London: Routledge Press, 1995). Journal of Biogeography.
- Posey, D. A. (1996). (Review of) Dance of the Dolphin: Transformation and Disenchantment, Candace Slater, (Chicago & London: The University of Chicago Press, 1994). Journal of Latin American Studies(May).
- Posey, D. A. (1996). (Review of) Indigenous Peoples & the Future of Amazonia: An Ecological Anthropology of an Endangered World, Leslie E. Sponsel, Editor (The University of Arizona Press, 1995). Journal of Biogeography.
- Posey, D. A. (1996). (Review of) This Sacred Earth: Religion, Nature, Environment, Paul Gottlieb (ed.), (London: Routledge Press, 1995). Journal of Biogeography.
- Posey, D. A. (1996). (Review of) Amazonia: Man and Culture in a Counterfeit Paradise, B. J. Meggars (Washington: Smithsonian Institution Press, 1995). Journal of Biogeography.
- Posey, D. A. (1998). (Review of) Changing Fortune: Biodiversity and Peasant Livelihood in the Peruvian Andes, Karl S. Zimmerer (Berkeley: University of California Press, 1996). Journal of Latin American Studies, 30 , 681–683.
- Posey, D. A. (1999). (Review of) Guns, Germs and Steel: The Fates of Human Societies, Jarred Diamond, (Jonathan Cape, London, 1997). Journal of Biogeography (Global Ecology and Biogeography, and Diversity and Distributions).
- Posey, D. A. (2000). (Review of) A Água e o Homem na Várzea do Careiro, Hilgard O'Reilly Sternberg. 1998, Second Edition, Coleção Friedrich Katzer, Belém, Pará: Museu Paraense Emílio Goeldi/CNPq (2 vols). Journal of Biogeography.

== See also ==
- Ethnobiology
- Indigenous intellectual property
