= Mitchell T. Rabkin =

American physician and professor (born 1930)

- Born: November 27, 1930 (age 95)
- Education: Harvard College; Harvard Medical School; Kent State University (M.S., 1991)
- Medical career
- Field: Medicine
- Institutions: Massachusetts General Hospital; Shapiro Institute; Harvard Medical School; Beth Israel Deaconess Medical Center

Mitchell T. Rabkin (born November 27, 1930) is an American physician and Distinguished Institute Scholar at the Shapiro Institute, Professor of Medicine at Harvard Medical School and CEO Emeritus at the Beth Israel Deaconess Medical Center.

== Education ==
Rabkin received his undergraduate degree in 1951 from Harvard College in Cambridge, Massachusetts. Upon graduation he attended Harvard Medical School (HMS), graduating in 1955.

== Medical career ==
Following graduation from Harvard Medical School, Rabkin began his residency at Massachusetts General Hospital (MGH) where he was named Chief Resident in Medicine in 1962. In 1966 he was selected by Beth Israel Deaconess Medical Center in Boston to become its president, a position he held for the next 30 years.

In 1972, he championed the creation and adoption of the nation's first Patient Bill of Rights, a milestone in shaping attitudes about patient care. Working with senior vice president and nurse-in-chief, Joyce Clifford, in the 1980s, he was a pioneer in the US, implementing the practice of primary nursing throughout the hospital and elevating the professional status of nursing to a level comparable to the medical specialties. In the 1990s, he oversaw the merger between Beth Israel Hospital and New England Deaconess Hospital, the formation of Caregroup, the parent not-for-profit organization of which he then became CEO, and subsequent affiliation with other hospitals in Massachusetts including Beth Israel Deaconess Hospital – Milton, Beth Israel Deaconess Hospital – Needham, Beth Israel Deaconess Hospital – Plymouth, Mount Auburn Hospital, and New England Baptist Hospital.

He served as Professor of Medicine, Harvard Medical School and Distinguished Institute Scholar at the Carl J. Shapiro Institute for Education and Research at Harvard Medical School and Beth Israel Deaconess Medical Center, which he and the late Daniel C. Tosteson, then dean of Harvard Medical School, helped form in 1996. He has served two three-year terms on the board of directors of the Duke University Health System. He currently serves as vice-chair of the New York University School of Medicine Foundation board of trustees and is the past chair of the Association of American Medical Colleges. He was a member of the advisory council of the National Academy of Medicine, National Academy of Sciences and is a Fellow of the American Academy of Arts and Sciences. Rabkin currently sits on the board of directors for the American Schweitzer Fellowship, serving as board chair from 2007 to 2009, and serves as a board member at Beth Israel Deaconess-Milton.

On May 9, 2015, Rabkin was awarded The Charles C. Winchester Distinguished Community Service Award recognizing his exemplary commitment, service, and leadership in the Milton community.
