= Integrated care =

Healthcare delivery model

Integrated care, also known as integrated health, coordinated care, comprehensive care, seamless care, interprofessional care or transmural care, is a worldwide trend in health care reforms and new organizational arrangements focusing on more coordinated and integrated forms of care provision. Integrated care may be seen as a response to the fragmented delivery of health and social services being an acknowledged problem in many health systems. This model of care is working towards moving away from a siloed and referral-based format of care to a team-based model.

== Central concepts ==
The integrated care literature distinguishes between different ways and degrees of working together and three central terms in this respect are autonomy, co-ordination, and integration. While autonomy refers to the one end of a continuum with least co-operation, integration (the combination of parts into a working whole by overlapping services) refers to the end with most co-operation and co-ordination (the relation of parts) to a point in between.

Distinction is also made between horizontal integration (linking similar levels of care like multiprofessional teams) and vertical integration (linking different levels of care like primary, secondary, and tertiary care).

Continuity of care is closely related to integrated care and emphasizes the patient's perspective through the system of health and social services, providing valuable lessons for the integration of systems. Continuity of care is often subdivided into three components:

- continuity of information (by shared records),
- continuity across the secondary–primary care interface (discharge planning from specialist to generalist care), and
- provider continuity (seeing the same professional each time, with value added if there is a therapeutic, trusting relationship).

Integrated care seems particularly important to service provision to the elderly, as elderly patients often become chronically ill and subject to co-morbidities and so have a special need of continuous care.

The NHS Long Term Plan, and many other documents advocating integration, claim that it will produce reductions in costs or emergency admissions to hospital but there is no convincing evidence to support this.

== Collaborative care ==
Collaborative care is a related healthcare philosophy and movement that has many names, models, and definitions that often includes the provision of mental-health, behavioral-health and substance-use services in primary care. Common derivatives of the name collaborative care include integrated care, primary care behavioral health, integrated primary care, and shared care.

The Agency for Healthcare Research and Quality (AHRQ) published an overview of many different models as well as research that supports them. These are the key features of collaborative care models:

- Integration of mental health professionals in primary care medical settings
- Close collaboration between mental health and medical/nursing providers
- Focus on treating the whole person and whole family.

There are various national associations committed to collaborative care such as the Collaborative Family Healthcare Association.

- a multiprofessional approach to patient care;
- a structured management plan tailored to the individual needs of the patient;
- proactive follow-up delivering evidence-based treatments;
- processes to enhance interprofessional communication such as routine and regular team meetings and/or shared records.

According to Shivam Shah collaborative care is a form of systematic team-based care involving:

- A case manager responsible for the coordination of different components of care;
- A structured care management plan, shared with the patient;
- Systematic patient management based on protocols and the tracking of outcomes;
- Delivery of care by a multidisciplinary team which includes a psychiatrist;
- Collaboration between primary and secondary care.

There are organizations in many countries promoting these ideas such as the American Collaborative Family Healthcare Association, a multi-guild member association based in Chapel Hill, North Carolina, which supports healthcare professionals in integrating physical and behavioral health. The University of Washington has an Advancing Integrated Mental Health Solutions Center, founded by Jürgen Unützer, to promote primary care behavioral health.

The Coalition for Collaborative Care was established in England in 2014. It focuses on re-framing the relationship between a person with long-term health conditions and the professionals supporting them.

== Contrast to merging roles ==
The proper integrating of care does not mean the merging of roles. It remains uneconomical to make a physician serve as a nurse. Besides, the opposite approach is strictly prohibited by accreditation and certification schemes. The mix of staff for the various roles is maintained to enable a profitable integration in caring. Beyond costs, task-sharing can also be helpful when there are not enough specialists available or other factors prohibit multiple roles involved in all care needs. A 2021 systematic review of found that counseling interventions delivered by trained nonspecialist providers, such as nurses and midwives, were effective in reducing perinatal depression and anxiety symptoms, highlighting task-sharing and telemedicine to expand mental health care access for pregnant and postpartum women.

== Examples ==
- The United States Department of Veterans Affairs is the largest integrated care delivery system in the US.
- Kaiser Permanente and the Mayo Clinic are the two largest private systems in the US.
- Essential for the implementation of the integrated care program is a framework that guides the process. In Ireland, the Health Service Executive (HSE) is implementing an integrated care program according to a 10-Step Framework. This Framework is created along the recommendation of the World Health Organization.

== See also ==
- Case management (disambiguation)
- Shared care
- Team nursing
- Integrated care system
- GP Liaison
- Health systems science
