= Joyce Clifford =

- Born: Joyce Catherine Hoyt; September 12, 1935; New Haven, Connecticut, U.S.
- Died: October 21, 2011 (aged 76); Boston, Massachusetts, U.S.
- Education: Brandeis University (Ph.D.); Saint Anselm College (B.S., 1959); University of Alabama in Birmingham (M.S., 1968)
- Known for: Primary nursing
- Medical career
- Institutions: Beth Israel Deaconess Medical Center

Joyce Catherine Clifford (September 12, 1935 – October 21, 2011) was a founder of the primary nursing model which was later applied to many hospitals because it reduced medical errors and improved survival rates.

== Early life and education ==
Clifford was born as Joyce Catherine Hoyt in New Haven, Connecticut, in 1935. She was one of four daughters of Raymond Hoyt, an ironworker, and his wife, Helen. Hoyt obtained her Ph.D. in health planning from Brandeis University and following it, got her nursing diploma from Hospital of Saint Raphael. In 1959 she obtained her Bachelor of Science degree from Saint Anselm College, New Hampshire. Her later studies were interrupted because she joined the United States Air Force in the 1960s and only in the mid 1960s did she resume her studying. During her military service with the United States Air Force Nurse Corps, Hoyt was assigned to Air University at Maxwell Air Force Base. She retired from the military with the rank of major. In 1968, Hoyt received a master's degree, with specialization in nursing administration from the University of Alabama at Birmingham.

== Career ==
Clifford began working as chief nurse at Beth Israel Deaconess Medical Center in 1974, under guidance from Mitchell T. Rabkin who at that time was president and chief executive of Beth Israel Hospital and member of the Harvard Medical School faculty. Following her internship, she introduced primary nursing model after one year of working there in order to improve patient care and increase nurse retention. In 1991 she founded the Institute for Nursing Healthcare Leadership, to promote and advance education in nursing and the primary nurse system. Prior to her death, she already was serving as vice-president for nursing and nurse-in-chief at Beth Israel. In 1999 she spoke at the first Anna Reynvaan Event in Amsterdam (Netherlands) and thus also became a well-known nurse on the European mainland. In 2005, Clifford was named a Living Legend of the American Academy of Nursing. She received the Living Legend in Massachusetts Nursing award from the Massachusetts Association of Registered Nurses two years later.

== Death ==
Clifford died from heart disease and kidney failure on October 21, 2011, in Boston, Massachusetts. She was married to Lawrence Clifford for 44 years.
