= Team nursing =

Team nursing is a system of integrated care that was developed in 1950s (under grant from W.K. Kellogg Foundation) directed by Eleanor Lambertson at Teachers College, Columbia University in New York, NY. Because the functional method received criticism, a new system of nursing was devised to improve patient satisfaction. “Care through others” became the hallmark of team nursing. It was developed in an effort to decrease the problems associated with the functional model of nursing care. Many people felt that, despite a continued shortage of professional nursing staff, a patient care delivery model had to be developed that reduced the fragmented care that accompanies functional nursing.

Team nursing was developed because of social and technological changes in World War II drew many nurses away from hospitals, learning haps, services, procedures and equipment became more expensive and complicated, requiring specialisation at every turn. It is an attempt to meet increased demands of nursing services and better use of knowledge and skills of professional nurses.

== Definitions ==
- Team nursing is a system that distributes the care of a patient amongst a team that is all working together to provide for this person. This team consists of up to 4 to 6 members that has a team leader who gives jobs and instructions to the group.
- Team nursing is based on philosophy in which groups of professional and non-professional personnel work together to identify, plan, implement and evaluate comprehensive client-centered care. The key concept is a group that works together toward a common goal, providing qualitative, comprehensive nursing care. Team nursing was designed to accommodate several categories of personnel in meeting the comprehensive nursing needs of a group of clients

Objective

The objective of team nursing is to give the best possible quality of patient care by utilising the abilities of every member of the staff to the fullest extent and by providing close supervision both of patient care and of the individual who give it.

== Line of organization ==
A clear line of organization and structure is needed for team nursing to provide a mechanism for horizontal and vertical communication, and an organized pattern is employed.

== Functions ==
The two important points of functioning are:

1. The head nurse must know at all times the condition of the patients and the plan for their care and must be assured that assignments and workmanship contribute to quality nursing
2. The team leader must have freedom to use their initiative and the opportunity to nurse, supervise, and teach unencumbered by the responsibility for administrative detail

== Functions of a registered nurse ==
- In team nursing the registered nurse (RN) functions as a team leader, and coordinates the small group (no more than four or five) of ancillary personnel to provide care to a small group of patients.
- As coordinator of the team, the RN must know the many conditions and needs of all patients assigned to the team and plan for the individualised care for each patient.
- The team leader is also responsible for encouraging a cooperative environment and maintaining clear communication among all team members.
- The team leader's duties include planning care, assigning duties, directing and assisting team members, giving direct patient care, teaching and coordinating patient activities.
- The team leader assigns each member specific responsibilities dependent on the role.
- The members of the team report directly to the team leader, who then reports to the charge nurse or unit manager.
- Communication is enhanced through the use of written patient assignments, the development of nursing care plans, and the use of regularly scheduled team conferences to discuss the patient status and formulate revisions to the plan of care.
- However, for team nursing to succeed, the team leader must have strong clinical skills, good communication skills, delegation ability, decision-making ability, and the ability to create a cooperative working environment.^

== Channels of communication ==
1. Reports
2. Work or assignment conference
3. Patient care conference
4. Written nursing care plan

The greatest single distinguishing feature of team nursing is the team conference. In general, there are three parts to the conference;

- Report by each team member on his or her patients.
- Planning for new patients and changing plans as needed for others.
- Planning the next day's assessment.

The conference is typically brief brief but comprehensive. The team leader serves as chair person, and offers opportunity for all personnel to evaluate patient care and solve the problems through team discussion.

=== Advantages ===
- High quality comprehensive care can be provided despite a relatively high proportion of ancillary staff.
- Each member of the team is able to participate in decision making and problem solving.
- Each team member is able to contribute his or her own special expertise or skills in caring for the patient.
- Improved patient satisfaction.
- Organisational decision making occurring at the lower level.
- Cost-effective system because it works with expected ratio of unlicensed to licensed personnel.
- Team nursing is an effective method of patient care delivery and has been used in most inpatient and outpatient health care settings.
- Feeling of participation and belonging are facilitated with team members.
- Work load can be balanced and shared.
- Division of labour allows members the opportunity to develop leadership skills.
- Every team member has the opportunity to learn from and teach colleagues
- There is a variety in the daily assignment.
- Interest in client's wellbeing and care is shared by several people, reliability of decisions is increased.
- Nursing care hours are usually cost effective.
- The client is able to identify personnel who are responsible for his care.
- Continuity of care is facilitated, especially if teams are constant.
- Barriers between professional and non-professional workers can be minimised, the group efforts prevail.
- Everyone has the opportunity to contribute to the care plan.

=== Disadvantages ===
- Establishing a team concept takes time, effort and constancy of personnel. Merely assigning people to a group does not make them a ‘group’ or ‘team’.
- Unstable staffing pattern make team nursing difficult.
- All personnel must be client centred.
- There is less individual responsibility and independence regarding nursing functions.
- Continuity of care may suffer if the daily team assignments vary and the patient is confronted with many different caregivers.
- The team leader may not have the leadership skills required to effectively direct the team and create a “team spirit”.
- Insufficient time for care planning and communication may lead to unclear goals. Therefore, responsibilities and care may become fragmented.

=== Modifications ===
In an attempt to overcome some of its disadvantages, the team nursing design has been modified many times since its original inception, and variations of the model are evident in other methods of nursing care delivery such, as modular nursing.

== Modular nursing ==
Modular nursing is a modification of team nursing and focuses on the patient's geographic location for staff assignments.

- The patient unit is divided into modules or districts, and the same team of caregivers is assigned consistently to the same geographic location.
- Each location, or module, has an RN assigned as the team leader, and the other team members may include LVN/LPN or UAP.
- Just as in the team nursing, the team leader in the modular nursing is accountable for all patient care and is responsible for providing leadership for team members and creating a cooperative work environment.
- The concept of modular nursing calls for a smaller group of staff providing care for a smaller group of patients.
- The goal is to increase the involvement of the RN in planning and coordinating care.
- Communication is more efficient among a smaller group of team members.
- The success of the modular nursing depends greatly on the leadership abilities of the team leader.

Advantages:

1. Continuity of care is improved when staff members are consistently assigned to the same module
2. The RN as team leader is able to be more involved in planning and coordinating care.
3. Geographic closeness and more efficient communication save staff time.

Disadvantages:

1. Costs may be increased to stock each module with the necessary patient care supplies (medication cart, linens and dressings).
2. Long corridors, common in many hospitals, are not conducive to modular nursing.

== See also ==
- Primary nursing
- Registered nurse
- Nurse manager
- Nursing
