= Creative Health Care Management =

US health education organization

- Formerly: Creative Nursing Management
- Company type: Private
- Industry: Health care consultation and training
- Founded: 1982; 44 years ago
- Founder: Marie Manthey
- Headquarters: Bloomington, Minnesota, United States

Creative Health Care Management (CHCM) is a private U.S. corporation, which provides consultation and training in the health care sector. CHCM is based in Bloomington, Minnesota. Founded in 1982 by Marie Manthey, it was originally called Creative Nursing Management. The name change to CHCM was in recognition of the systemic nature of change.

== Consulting Practice ==
Creative Nursing Management (later named Creative Health Care Management) was originally established to support the implementation of primary nursing, by applying lessons learned from the original implementation at the University Hospital.

Creative Nursing Management developed a curriculum to prepare staff nurses to become nursing managers. It is licensed to organizations around the world, who do their own 'train-the-trainer' trainings and then are able to provide the content themselves.

Creative Nursing Management became Creative Health Care Management in recognition of a shift to a partnership model in the way the company defined its relationship with health care providers.

== Nursing literature ==
The Practice of Primary Nursing was first published in 1980 by Blackwell Scientific. The updated 2002 edition that Creative Health Care Management published was well received.

The book Relationship-Based Care: A Model for Transforming Practice was published by CHCM in 2004, and it applies the original concepts of Primary Nursing to all functions and relationships within the hospital setting. The RBC book has been translated into German and other languages (Note: Relationship-Based Care won the 2004 American Journal of Nursing Book of the Year in the Leadership and Management category.)

In 2007 CHCM published 'I2E2: Leading Lasting Change,' by Jayne Felgen. (Note: I2E2 was named a ‘Book of the Year’ for 2007 by the American Journal of Nursing)

CHCM published 'See Me As a Person: Creating Therapeutic Relationships with Patients and Their Families' by Mary Koloroutis, RN and Michael Trout in 2012.

In 2016 CHCM published 'Primary Nursing: Person-Centered Care Delivery System Design' by Susan Wessel and Marie Manthey. (Note: ‘’Primary Nursing: Person-Centered Care Delivery System Design’’ was named a 2016 book of the year by the American Journal of Nursing in the category of Nursing Management and Leadership)

CHCM published 'Advancing Relationship-Based Culture' by Mary Koloroutis, RN and David Abelson, MD in 2017. Advancing Relationship-Based Cultures explores the confluence of relational and clinical competence that advances relationship-based healing cultures. Advancing Relationship-Based Cultures won the 2018 American College of Healthcare Executives James A. Hamiliton Book of the Year Award.

== Titles published (selected) ==
- Madden, Mary Jane and Marie Manthey, Manual for Nurse Managers (1987)
- Lampe, Susan, Focus Charting: A Patient-Centered Approach (1992)
- Manthey, Marie, The practice of primary nursing : relationship-based resource-driven care delivery (2002)
- Koloroutis, Mary, Jayne Felgen, Donna Wright, Colleen Person, Marie Manthey and Leah Kinnaird, Relationship-Based Care: A Model for Transforming Practice (2004)
- Koloroutis, Mary, Jayne Felgen, Colleen Person and Susan Wessel, Relationship-Based Care Field Guide (2007)
- Felgen, Jayne, I2E2: Leading Lasting Change (2007)
- Koloroutis, Mary, and Michael Trout, See Me as a Person: Creating Therapeutic Relationships with Patients and Their Families (2012)
- Glembocki, Margaret J. and Joyce J. Fitzpatrick; Editors, Advancing Professional Nursing Practice: Relationship-Based Care and the ANA Standards (2013)
- Wessel, Susan and Marie Manthey, Primary nursing : person-centered care delivery system design (2015)
- Koloroutis, Mary, RN and David Abelson, MD, Advancing Relationship-Based Cultures (2017)
- Guanci Gen and Marky Medeiros, Shared Governance That Works (2018)
- Wright, Donna, MS, RN, NPD-BC, The Ultimate Guide to Competency Assessment in Health Care 4th Edition (2022)

== Links ==
- 'Model of Care.' UC Irvine Health Sciences http://www.healthsciences.uci.edu/nursing/model-of-care.asp
- Falter, Betty (April 2006). "Relationship-Based Care: A Model for Transforming Practice". Nursing Administration Quarterly. 30 (2): 182. doi:10.1097/00006216-200604000-00018.
- Campbell, Michelle P (Fall 2009). "Relationship Based Care Is Here" (PDF). The Journal of Lancaster General Hospital. 4 (3): 87–89.
- Shellner, Pamela (February 2007). "Relationship-Based Care: A Model for Transforming Practice". Critical Care Nurse. 27 (1): 66. doi:10.4037/ccn2007.27.1.66.
- 2016 Nursing Alumni Society Board, University of Minnesota School of Nursing https://www.nursing.umn.edu/news-events/minnesota-nursing-magazine/2016-nursing-alumni-society-board
- The Interdisciplinary Journal of Partnership Studies Launch, University of Minnesota Women's Center Blog 12/5/14, https://mnwomenscenter.wordpress.com/2014/12/05/the-interdisciplinary-journal-of-partnership-studies-launch/
- Publication Ethics, https://publicationethics.org/members/creative-nursing
- Shebini, N. et al. (2008). 'Improved patient awareness of named nursing through audit.' NursingTimes.net, https://www.nursingtimes.net/roles/mental-health-nurses/improved-patient-awareness-of-named-nursing-through-audit/1425602.article
- Clinical Nursing Practices E-Book: Guidelines for Evidence-Based Practice: E-Book. Elsevier Health Sciences. 2007. ISBN 978-0-7020-3338-4.
- "American College of Healthcare Executives 2018 Publishing Awards" (PDF).
