= Ethnoscience =

Branch of science involving the study of the world categorised in ethnic cultures

Ethnoscience has been defined as an attempt "to reconstitute what serves as science for others, their practices of looking after themselves and their bodies, their botanical knowledge, but also their forms of classification, of making connections, etc." (Augé, 1999: 118).

== Origins ==
Ethnoscience has not always focused on ideas distinct from those of "cognitive anthropology", "component analysis", or "the New Ethnography"; it is a specialization of indigenous knowledge-systems, such as ethno-botany, ethno-zoology, ethno-medicine, etc. (Atran, 1991: 595). According to Scott Atran, ethnoscience looks at culture with a scientific perspective (1991: 650), although most anthropologists abhor this definition. Ethnoscience helps to understand how people develop with different forms of knowledge and beliefs, and focuses on the ecological and historical contributions people have been given (Atran, 1991: 650). Tim Ingold describes ethnoscience as a cross-discipline (2000: 160). He writes that ethnoscience is based on increased collaboration between social sciences and the humanities (e.g., anthropology, sociology, psychology, and philosophy) with natural sciences such as biology, ecology, or medicine (Ingold, 2000: 406–7). At the same time, ethnoscience is increasingly transdisciplinary in its nature (Ingold, 2000: 407).

The ways in which data has been collected and studied has changed and the field has evolved, becoming more detailed and specific (Urry, 1972: 45). The ideas, mechanics, and methods of ethnoscience evolved from something else - a combination of several things. This pretext amalgamation of theories, processes, and -isms led to the evolution of today's ethnoscience.

== Early approaches ==
Early on, Franz Boas established cultural relativism as an approach to understanding indigenous scientific practices (Uddin, 2005: 980). Cultural relativism identifies people's differences and shows how they are a result of the social, historical, and geographical conditions (Uddin, 2005: 980). Boas is known for his work in Northern Vancouver, British Columbia, Canada, working with the Kwakwaka'wakw Indians, which is where he established the importance of culture (Uddin, 2005: 980). Lévi-Strauss' structuralism was a strong contributor to the ideas of ethnoscience (Uddin, 2005: 980). It, itself, was the leading idea of providing structure to the research and a guide to organizing and relating different cultures. "Ethnoscience refers to a 'reduction of chaos' achieved by a particular culture, rather than to the 'highest possible and conscious degree' to which such chaos may be reduced"; basically, the ethnoscience of a society creates its culture (Sturtevant, 1964: 100). Much of the influence of anthropology, e.g., geographical determinism, was through the contributions of Jean Bodin (Harris, 1968: 42). In his text, he tried to explain why "northern people were faithful, loyal to the government, cruel, and sexually uninterested, compared to why southern people were malicious, craft, wise, expert in science but ill-adapted to political activity (Harris, 1968: 52)." The Greek historian, Polybius, asserted "we mortals have an irresistible tendency to yield to climatic influences; and to this cause, and no other, may be traced the great distinctions that prevail among us in character, physical formation, complexion, as well as in most of our habits..." (quoted in Harris, 1968: 41).

Another aspect of anthropology prior to ethnoscience is enculturation. Newton and Newton described enculturation as a process whereby the novice, or "outsider", learns what is important to the "insider" (1998). Marvin Harris writes, "One of [enculturation's] most important technical expressions is the doctrine of 'psychic unity,' the belief that in the study of sociocultural differences, hereditary (genetic) differences cancel each other out, leaving 'experience' as the most significant variable" (Harris, 1968: 15). This is one of the many starts of people opening up to the idea that just because people are different, does not mean they are wrong in their thinking. Harris describes how religious beliefs hinder and affect the progress of anthropology and ethnography. The moral beliefs and restrictions of religion fought against anthropological ideas, possibly due to (especially at the time) the newly hyped idea of evolutionism and Darwinism (Harris, 1968).

Bronislaw Malinowski was one of many who contributed heavily to the precursor of ethnoscience. His earlier work brought attention to sociological studies; his earliest publication focused on a family in Australia, using a sociological study perspective (Harris, 1968: 547). After the First World War, anthropological work was at a standstill; nothing had evolved, if not regressed (Urry, 1972: 54). This allowed him to start from scratch, and rebuild his ideas and methods (Harris, 1968: 547).

Later, however, Malinowski branched out to political evolution during World War II. The period after World War II is what led to ethnoscience; anthropologists learned their skills could be applied to problems that were affecting modern societies (Mead, 1973: 1). Malinowski said "... with his tables of kinship terms, genealogies, maps, plans and diagrams, proves an extensive and big organization, shows the contribution of the tribe, of the clan, of the family, and he gives a picture of the natives subjected to a strict code of behavior and good manners, to which in comparison the life at the Court of Versailles or Escurial was free and easy" (1922: 10). After World War II, there was an extreme amount of growth in the anthropological field, not only with research opportunities but academically, as well (Mead, 1973: 2).

The anthropologist Robin Horton, who taught at several Nigerian universities, considered the traditional knowledge of indigenous peoples as incorporated within conceptual world views that bear certain similarities to, and differences from, the modern scientific worldview. Like modern science, traditional thought provides a theoretical structure that "places things in a causal order wider than that provided by common sense" (Horton, 1967, p. 53). In contrast to modern science, he saw traditional thought as having a limited awareness of theoretical alternatives and, consequently, displaying "an absolute acceptance of the established theoretical tenets" (Horton, 1967, pp. 155–6).

There are dozens, if not hundreds, of related methods and processes that preceded ethnoscience. Ethnoscience is just another way to study human culture and the way people interact in society. Taking a look at the ideas and analyses prior to ethnoscience can help understand why it was developed in the first place. Although, it is not widely used and there is criticism on both ends, ethnoscience allows for a more comprehensive way to collect data and patterns of a people. This is not to say the process is its best or that there will be nothing better. That is the best part: everything evolves, even thought. Just as the ideas did in the past, they can improve over time and regress over time but change is inevitable.

== Development ==
Ethnoscience is a new term and study that came into anthropological theory in the 1960s. Often referred to as 'indigenous' or 'traditional' knowledge, ethnoscience introduces a perspective based on native perceptions. It is based on a complete emic perspective, which excludes all observations, interpretations and or any personal notions belonging to the ethnographer. The taxonomy and classification of indigenous systems, to name a few, used to categorize plants, animals, religion and life is adapted from a linguistic analysis. The concept of "Native Science" is also related to the understanding the role of the environment intertwined with the meaning humans place upon their lives. Understanding the language and the native people's linguistic system is one method to understand a native people's system of knowledge of organization. Not only is there categorization for things pertaining to nature and culture through language, but more importantly and complex is the relationship between environment and culture. Ethnoscience looks at the intricacies of the connection between culture and its surrounding environment. There are also potential limitations and shortcomings in interpreting these systems of knowledge as a dictation of culture and behavior.

Since an ethnographer is not able to physically enter inside an indigenous person's mind, it is essential to not only create a setting or question-answer format to understand perspective but to analyze semantics and word order of given answer to derive an emic understanding. The main focus on a particular component of the languages is placed on its lexicon. The terms "etic" and "emic" are derived from the linguistic terms of "phonetic" and "phonemic".

As introduced by Gregory Cajete, some limitations the concept of indigenous knowledge, is the potential to bypass non-indigenous knowledge as pertinent and valuable. The labels of "indigenous" are overly accepted by those who seek more support by outsiders to further their cause. There might also be an unequal distribution of knowledge amongst a tribe or peoples. There is also the idea that culture is bound by environment. Some theorists conclude that indigenous people's culture is not operated by mental concentrations but solely by the earth that surrounds them. Some theorists go the extent to state that biological processes are based upon the availability, of lack thereof, environmental resources. The methods for sustainability are founded through the workings of the land. These techniques are exercised from the basis of tradition. The importance of the combination of ecological process, social structures, environmental ethics and spiritual ecology are crucial to the expression of the true connection between the natural world and "ecological consciousness".

The origin of Ethnoscience began between the years 1960 to 1965; deriving from the concept of "ethno- + science". Ethno- a combining form meaning "race", "culture", "people", used in the formation of compound words: ethnography. The two concepts later emerged into "ethno-science". The origin of the word 'science' involves the empiric observation of measurable quantities and the testing of hypotheses to falsify or support them. "Ethnoscience refers to the system of knowledge and cognition typical of a given culture...to put it another way a culture itself amounts to the sum of a given society's folk classifications, all of that society's ethnoscience, its particular ways of classifying its material and social universe" (Sturtevant 1964: 99–100). The aim of ethnoscience is to gain a more complete description of cultural knowledge. Ethnoscience has been successfully used on several studies of given cultures relating to their linguistics, folk taxonomy, and how they classify their foods, animals and plants.

=== Ethnolinguistics ===
Ethnoscience is the examination of the perceptions, knowledge, and classifications of the world as reflected in their use of language, which can help anthropologists understand a given culture. By using an ethnographic approach to studying a culture and learning their lexicon and syntax they are able to gain more knowledge in understanding how a particular culture classifies its material and social universe. In addition, this approach "adopted provides simultaneously a point at which the discipline of linguistics, or at least some of its general attitudes, may sensibly be used in anthropology and as a means of gaining insight not only into the nature of man but also into the nature of culture" (Videbeck and Pia, 1966).

Researchers can use linguistics to study what a given culture considers important in a given situation or unforeseen event, and can rank those potential situations in terms of their likelihood to recur. In addition, "understanding the contingencies is helpful in the task of comprehending folk taxonomies on the one hand, and, on the other, an understanding of the taxonomy is required for a full scale appreciation of criteria considered relevant in a given culture (Videbeck and Pia, 1966).

=== Taxonomy and classification ===
Ethnoscience can be used to analyze the kinship terminology of a given culture, using their language and according to how they view members of their society. Taxonomies "are models of analysis whose purpose is the description of particular types of hierarchical relationships between members of a given set of elements" (Perchonock and Werner, 1969). For example, in our society we classify family groups by giving members the title of father, mother, sister, daughter, brother, son, grandfather, grandmother, etc.

=== System of classification – among cultures ===
Ethnoscience deals with how a given culture classifies certain principles in addition to how it is express through their language. By understanding a given culture through how they view the world, anthropologists attempt to eliminate any bias through translation as well as categorized their principles in their own ways. "The new methods, which focus on the discovery and description of folk systems, have come to be known as Ethnoscience. Ethnoscience analysis has thus far concentrated on systems of classification within such cultural and linguistic domains as colors, plants, and medicines" (Perchonock and Werner, 1969). An ethnoscientific approach can be used to better understand a given culture and their knowledge of their culture. Using an ethnographic approach can help anthropologists understand how that given culture views and categorizes their own foods, animal kingdom, medicines, as well as plants.

=== Contemporary research ===
Ethnoscience can be effectively summed up as a classification system for a particular culture in the same way that a botanist would use a taxonomic system for the classification of plant species. Everything from class levels, food consumption, clothing, and material culture objects would be subjected to a taxonomic classification system. In essence, ethnoscience is a way of classifying cultural systems in a structured order to better understand the culture. The roots of ethnoscience can be traced back to influential anthropologists such as Franz Boas, Bronislaw Malinowski, and Benjamin Whorf who attempted to understand other cultures from an insider's perspective. Ward Goodenough is accredited for bringing ethnoscience to the stage when he define cultural systems of knowledge by stating:

"A societies culture consists of whatever it is one has to know or believe in order to operate in a manner acceptable to its members. Culture is not a material phenomenon; it does not consist of things, behavior, or emotions. It is rather an organization of these things. It is the form of things that people have in mind, their models for perceiving, relating, and otherwise interpreting them."

(Goodenough 1957:167)

In order to properly put ethnoscience in context we must first understand the definition of ethnoscience. it is defined as "an attempt at cultural description from a totally emic perspective (a perspective in ethnography that uses the concepts and categories that are relevant and meaningful to the culture that is insider analysis) standpoint, this eliminating all of the ethnographer's own categories" (Morey and Luthans 27). Ethnoscience is also a way of learning and understanding how an individual or group perceive their environment and how they fit in with their environment as reflected in their own words and actions.

Ethnoscience has many techniques when applied to an emic perspective. Ethnosemantics, ethnographic semantics, ethnographic ethnoscience, formal analysis, and componential analysis are the terms that apply to the practice of ethnoscience. Ethnosemantics looks at the meaning of words in order to place them in context of the culture being studied. It allows for taxonomy of a certain part of the culture being looked at so that there is a clear breakdown which in turn leads to a deeper understanding of the subject at hand. Ethnographic semantics are very similar to cognitive anthropology in that its primary focus is the intellectual and rational perspectives of the culture being studied. Ethnographic semantics specifically looks at how language is used throughout the culture. Lastly, ethnographic ethnoscience is related to ethnosemantics such that, it uses a taxonomic system to understand how cultural knowledge is accessible through language. Ethnographic ethnoscience uses similar classification systems for cultural domains like ethnobotany and ethnoanatomy. Again, ethnoscience is a way of understanding a how a culture sees itself through its own language. Understanding the cultural language allows the ethnographer to have a deeper and more intimate understanding of the culture.

== See also ==
- ethno-
  - astronomy
  - biology
  - botany
  - chemistry
  - ecology
  - mathematics
  - medicine
  - pharmacy
  - zoology
  - musicology
  - paleontology
- traditional
  - knowledge
  - medicine
