= Oswald Werner =

American linguist (1928–2023)

Oswald J. Werner
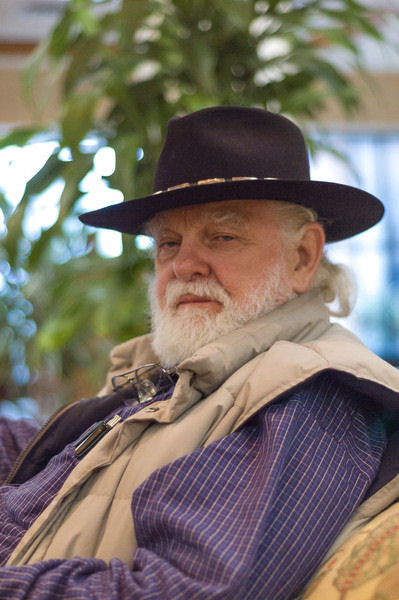
- Oswald Werner in 2006
- Born: February 26, 1928; Rimavská Sobota, Czechoslovakia
- Died: March 26, 2023 (aged 95); Santa Fe, New Mexico, U.S.
- Other name: Ossy
- Citizenship: USA, naturalized 1954
- Education: 1961–1963 Indiana University Bloomington, Anthropology (Linguistics minor); Ph.D. Dissertation: "A Typological Comparison of Four Trader Navajo Speakers"; 1958–1960 Syracuse University, Anthropology; M.A. Thesis: Ethnographic Photography; 1954–1955 Syracuse University; Photo-journalism; 1946–1950 Technische Hochschule, Stuttgart, Germany; Applied Physics, B.S. equivalent
- Occupations: Professor Emeritus of Anthropology and Linguistics
- Years active: 1963–2005
- Employer: Northwestern University
- Organization(s): Department of Anthropology and Department of Linguistics
- Known for: Ethnography, ethnoscience, linguistics, anthropology
- Spouse: June Travers (1924–2015)
- Children: Deborah, Derek, Rickard
- Parent(s): Julius M., Bella L. (née Toth)

Oswald J. Werner (February 26, 1928 – March 26, 2023), better known as Ossy Werner, was a Slovak-born American linguist. He was Professor of Anthropology and Linguistics for thirty years at Northwestern University and retired in 1998 as Professor Emeritus of Anthropology and Linguistics. During this period he researched the Navajo language and culture. Although specializing in their medicine and science, he impacted anthropology, linguistics, ethnography, ethnographic methodology, ethnoscience, and cognitive anthropology.

== Early life ==
Oswald J. Werner was born February 26, 1928, in Rimavská Sobota, Czechoslovakia in what is now south-central Slovakia. His father, Professor Julius M. Werner, was Slovak, while his mother, Bella L. (née Toth), was Hungarian. The history of the area with its malleable borders following World War I required an academic family to know all three languages, Slovak, Hungarian, and German.

Matriculating at the Technische Hochschule in Stuttgart, Germany, he studied applied physics, graduating in 1950 with a bachelor's degree equivalent. Without knowing English, he emigrated in 1951 to the United States, learning the new language while serving in the army.

== Anthropology and linguistics ==
Starting at Syracuse University's school of journalism in 1954, he also read and took courses in anthropology. A summer of archaeological field work and photography at Mesa Verde National Park brought him into daily contact with Navajo laborers. This piqued his interest, which led to changing his field of study to anthropology.

Werner received his master's degree in anthropology in 1961 from Syracuse. Wanting to continue his studies under the anthropological linguist, C. F. Voegelin, he was accepted at the Indiana University Bloomington in the department of anthropology. In many schools, linguistics is considered a sub-discipline of anthropology. With Voegelin as advisor, Werner became interested in "Trader Navajo" which was spoken by the Anglo traders on the then Navajo Reservation, now the Navajo Nation. This simplified Navajo or pidgin spoken at the often isolated trading posts became the subject of his doctoral dissertation, A Typological Comparison of Four Trader Navajo Speakers (Indiana University, 1963).

== Northwestern University and professional affiliations ==
Werner started teaching at Northwestern University in Evanston, Illinois, in 1963 as assistant professor. Moving through the ranks from associate professor in 1969 and finally to full professor by 1971, he served as chair of the department from 1978–83 and then again from 1987 to 1989. Werner retired from Northwestern in 1998.

After retiring, Northwestern University's anthropology department created The Oswald Werner Prize for Distinguished Honors Theses in Anthropology.

Werner was active in his profession and served on committees of the National Institute of Mental Health, the American Anthropological Association, the Linguistic Society of America, and the Central States Anthropological Society . He also served as president of Cultural Anthropology Methods (renamed Field Methods) in 1989 having had a regular column in the journal.

== Death ==
Oswald Werner died in Santa Fe, New Mexico on March 26, 2023, at the age of 95.

== Significance of his work ==
Werner was a student of Navajo folk knowledge for over 30 years and moved easily between linguistics and cultural anthropology. Noting lapses in how others approached ethnography led him to develop methodologies for cultural anthropology and ethnoscience. In particular, ethnoscience was used to analyze Navajo culture by delving into their world view, specifically botany and folk-science.

Werner edited books and authored over 70 publications on the Navajo, cultural anthropology, and anthropological methodology. The often cited two-volume Systematic Fieldwork with G. Mark Schoepfle was one of his most significant contributions. It is the only book on ethnographic method that deals with ethnographic translation. The methodological tools that the volumes discuss are used to describe cultural systems of knowledge. One of the tools is the use of semantic network models, which can be used to build an encyclopedia of cultural knowledge. For work such as this, he is considered by James F. Hamill as "...a leading theoretician in cognitive anthropology."

Systematic Fieldwork earned the nomination as best-selling book of the year on that publisher's list. Seventeen entries between 1986 and 1989 are listed by WorldCat. In total, he has over 1300 entries in member libraries worldwide.

Not only did the book establish procedures and methods for anthropological field work, but it set precedences in the ways personal computers can be used in the field for data collection, management, and analysis. Werner also intensively explored the pragmatic aspects of employing the ethnoscience approach to data collection through mentoring his students in the Northwestern University Summer Ethnographic Field School. He pursued this interest to the policy level through his leadership of the Northwestern University Program on Ethnography and Public Policy, which helped define the contours of the relationship of ethnography to applied anthropology and the formation and execution of government policy.

Also of note, ethnoscientists, following anthropological linguists such as C.F. Voegelin, were among the first ethnographers to begin using the term "consultant" as opposed to "informant". This was a significant change in how the ethnographer viewed the people he was studying. Per Luke E. Lassiter, this meant that they were viewed as "co-intellectuals" in partnership with the ethnographer to investigate the intricacies of the indigenous world view. Thus, Oswald Werner coauthored papers with Navajo consultants such as Kenneth Y. Begishe and Martha A. Austin on Navajo culture and language.

Another work was "The Navaho ethnomedical domain: prolegomena to a componential semantic analysis" (1964) which defines Navajo terms for diseases. Expanding on this was a Navajo Medical Encyclopedia which basically converted Western medicine for application to the Navajo.

Through his writings as well as teachings, he influenced many undergraduate and graduate students. He insisted on individual choice and responsibility by his students. Starting in 1974 he founded and directed the Northwestern University Ethnographic Field School in Cultural and Linguistic Anthropology outside Gallina, New Mexico, not far from the Navajo Nation. Both undergraduate and graduate students were immersed in ethnographic field methods. They worked together with communities on the Navajo Nation and with Hispanic communities in northern New Mexico. In fact, research done there has already felt its influence in additional studies regarding the Navajo by his students with Werner's guidance.

Such training in fieldwork addresses the historically poor state of methodological training in anthropology. To advance, it is necessary to establish minimum standards for ethnography since historically, anthropological monographs have not been science, but a "work of art" which reflect the ethnographer more than their subjects.

== Honors ==
- Postdoctoral fellowship during 1963-64 by the National Science Foundation
- National Institute of Mental Health, senior postdoctoral fellowship during 1975–76
- American Association for the Advancement of Science Fellowship in 1981
- Fulbright Professor of Linguistics at the Universidad Católica, Valparaiso, Chile (1974)
- Fulbright Research Professor at Janus Pannonius University of Pecs, Hungary (1987)
- Visiting professor at Universiteit Gent in Belgium (awarded the Sarton Medal) (1993)

== Often cited works ==
- 1965 Semantics of Navajo Medical Terms: I. International Journal of American Linguistics 31:1-17.
- 1966 (with Kenneth Y. Begishe.) The Anatomical Atlas of the Navajo. Northwestern University
- 1966 Pragmatics and Ethnoscience, Anthropological Linguistics 8.8:42-65
- 1968 (with Kenneth Y. Begishe.) Styles of learning: The evidence from Navaho.
- 1969 (with Norma Perchonock) Navajo Systems of Classification: The Domain of Foods, Ethnology 8:229-242.
- 1969 The Basic Assumptions of Ethnoscience, Semiotica 1:328-38.
- 1970 (with D. T. Campbell) Translating, Working Through Interpreters, and the Problem of Decentering, in R. Naroll and R. Cohen, eds., Handbook of Anthropology, Natural History Press, pages 398–420.
- 1970 (with K. Y. Begishe) A Lexemic Typology of Navajo Anatomical Terms. I. The Foot. International Journal of American Linguistics 36:247-65 (special issue in memory of Hans Wolff).
- 1970 Cultural Knowledge, Language, and World View, in P. Garvin, ed., Cognition: A Multiple View, Elsevier. (Paper presented at the Wenner-Gren Conference on Artificial Intelligence and Cognition, March 1969, Chicago), pages 15–75.
- 1972 (with M.D. Topper) Ethnoscience 1972, in B. Siegel, ed., Annual Reviews of Anthropology, pages 271–308.
- 1973 "Structural anthropology." Main Currents in Cultural Anthropology. New York: Appleton-Century-Crofts.
- 1973 (with Joann Fenton) "Method and theory in ethnoscience or ethnoepistemology." A Handbook of Method in Cultural Anthropology, pages 537–578.
- 1975 (with M. D. Kinkade and K. L. Hale, eds.) Anthropology and Linguistics: Essays in Honor of Carl F. Voegelin, Peter DeRidder Press, 700 pages.
- 1975 (with Gladys Levis, Bonnie Litowitz, and Martha Evens) An Ethnoscience View of Schizophrenic Speech, in B. Blount and Mary Sanches, eds., Sociocultural Dimensions of Language Use, Academic Press, pages 349–80.
- 1975 On the Limits of Social Science Theory, in Kinkade et al., eds., pages 677–90.
- 1976 (with M. D. Topper) On the Theoretical Unity of Ethnoscience Lexicography and Ethnoscience Ethnography. Proceedings, Georgetown University Roundtable on Language and Linguistics 1976, in Clea Rameh, ed., Semantics: Theory and Application, pages 131–70.
- 1978 The Synthetic Informant Model: On the Simulation of Large Lexical/Semantic Fields, in M. D. Loflin and J. Silverberg, Discourse and Inference in Cognitive Anthropology: An Approach to Psychic Unity and Enculturation, Mouton, pages 45–82.
- 1978 (with L. E. Fisher) Explaining Explanation: Tension in American Anthropology, Journal of Anthropological Research 34:194-218.
- 1979 (with G. Schoepfle.) "Handbook of Ethnoscience: Ethnographies and Encyclopedias." Evanston, Illinois: Department of Anthropology, Northwestern University.
- 1980 (with D. Brokensha and D. M. Warren, eds.) Indigenous Knowledge Systems and Development, University Press of America.
- 1983 Microcomputers in Cultural Anthropology, APL Programs for Qualitative Analysis, BYTE 7.7:250-80.
- 1983 (with A. Manning and K. Y. Begishe) A Taxonomic View of the Traditional Navajo Universe, in A. Ortiz, ed., Handbook of North American Indians, Volume 10, Smithsonian Institution, pages 579–91.
- 1986 (with H.R. Bernard, P.J. Pelto, J. Boster, A.K. Romney, A. Johnson, C.R. Ember, and A. Kasakoff, The Construction of Primary Data in Cultural Anthropology, Current Anthropology 27:382-96.
- 1987 (with G. Mark Schoepfle, et al.) Systematic Fieldwork, Volume 1: Foundation of Ethnography and Interviewing (416 pages), Volume 2: Ethnographic Analysis and Data Management (355 pages), Sage Publishing Co.
- 1989 How to Teach a Network, in M. Evens (ed.), Network Models in Semantics, Cambridge University Press. pages 141–166. (Also read at pre-conference meeting of the Society for Computational Linguistics on Semantic Networks.)
- 1992 Short Take 7.: How to Record Activities, Cultural Anthropology Methods 4.2:1-3.
- 1994 The Sapir Whorf Hypothesis. (Contract Number 17106A/0217) The Encyclopedia of Language and Linguistics, Paragon Press and Aberdeen University Press, 25 pages.
- 1994 Short Take 13.: Ethnographic Sampling, Cultural Anthropology Methods 6.2.
- 1994 Ethnographic Translation: Issues and Challenges, Sartoniana 7:59-135. (Lecture presented on the occasion of being awarded the Sarton Medal, Universiteit Gent, Belgium).
- 2000 "How to reduce an unwritten language to writing: I," Field Methods 12.1: pages 61–71.
