= Victoria Castro =

Victoria Castro Rojas, also known as Vicky Castro, was a Chilean archaeologist and pioneer in the field of ethnohistory, focusing her research on the diverse pre-Columbian cultures of the Andes, particularly in northern Chile, where she made an enormous contribution to reconstructing the pre-Hispanic past. She was recognized on numerous occasions with prizes and awards. In her studies and research, she adopted an interdisciplinary approach aimed at integrating archaeology, ethnohistory, ethnobiology, and cultural anthropology.
