= Ethnochemistry =

Study of chemical ideas found in any culture

Ethnochemistry is the study of chemical ideas found in any culture; where an appreciation of cultural heritage is preserved. In the West African country of Ghana, an example of this are the bead makers who do not explain what they're doing in modern chemical terms, though they do explain the process in their own artistic way. A similar concept is ethnomathematics; Achor, et al. concluded that there was a positive impact on the achievement of students and retention of knowledge when ethnomathematics is applied to a classroom setting, it can also help to make students aware of the role in which chemistry plays in their everyday lives.
