= Marie Manthey =

American nurse, author and businesswoman (1935–2024)

- Born: July 17, 1935
- Died: December 12, 2024 (aged 89)
- Education: St. Elizabeth Hospital(Diploma); University of Minnesota (B.S.N.); University of Minnesota (M.S.N)
- Occupation: President Emeritus
- Known for: Primary nursing
- Awards: Living Legend of the American Academy of Nursing (2015)
- Website: https://mariesnursingsalon.wordpress.com/

Marie Schuber Manthey (July 17, 1935 – December 12, 2024) was an American nurse, author and businesswoman. She was one of the originators of primary nursing, a system of nursing care delivery.

Manthey was named a Living Legend of the American Academy of Nursing in 2015. The Living Legends designation honors individuals with "extraordinary contributions to the nursing profession, sustained over the course of their careers".

Manthey died on December 12, 2024, at the age of 89.

== Education ==
Manthey received a diploma in nursing from St. Elizabeth Hospital in Chicago, Illinois in 1956. After passing the Illinois State Boards, she joined the University of Chicago Medical Center as a staff nurse, and then became an assistant head nurse and then head nurse on a twenty-bed surgical floor there. She received her Bachelor of Science in Nursing Administration in 1962 and her Master of Science, Nursing Administration in 1964, both from the University of Minnesota School of Nursing in Minneapolis. Manthey was awarded an honorary doctorate from the University of Minnesota in 1999.

== Primary nursing ==
Primary nursing emphasizes continuity of care and acceptance of responsibility for care over a period of time by the patient's primary nurse - usually a registered nurse (RN). The care team consists of the primary nurse and additional staff - a licensed practical nurse (LPN) and/or nursing assistant (NA) - and together they provide complete care for a group of patients within a hospital unit or department.

While serving as assistant director of Nursing at the University of Minnesota Hospital, Manthey was head of a team of nurses that implemented primary nursing in 1968–1969 on Unit 32, an acute medical care ward. Manthey was later named associate director of Nursing at the University of Minnesota.

In 1968 primary nursing evolved from the work of a team of direct care providers on Unit 32 at the University of Minnesota Medical Center who were experiencing extreme frustration with their chaotic work environment. The result was a nursing delivery system that was "too fragmented and diffuse -- one in which 'everybody's responsible for everything and nobody's responsible for anything'."

Up to that time, nurses had been expected to follow policies and orders rather than making decisions based on their own professional judgment. Nurses providing direct care also did not generally communicate with physicians. Instead, patient information was communicated by the unit manager or nurse in charge. These individuals served as a go between, transmitting patient information/messages and orders between the nurses providing patient care and the patient's physician.

"The change to primary nursing eliminated one level of nursing supervision, the traditional team leader, and flattened the well-worn hierarchical structure. Each registered nurse on Station 32 assumed 24-hour responsibility and accountability to plan nursing care for a small group of patients. The results were positive, totally unplanned and nearly palpable. The staff nurse instantly earned, and claimed, the power to make nursing decisions. Almost overnight, communication changed to a direct, person-to-person pattern; physicians discussed patients with the nurse caregiver, not the head or charge nurse."

The primary nursing model, which emphasizes "relationship-based care" is based on "one nurse taking responsibility for one small group of patients, delivering individualized care for the duration of the stay." "The essence … is that primary nursing is really a generic term that simply means one nurse accepting responsibility for managing the care of a small number of patients. Who delivers the care, what the ratio mix is, what the skill level is, what the staffing level is, what the care plans look like, none of those things make a difference. What makes a difference is whether the nurse accepts responsibility for managing the care of the patients."

At the core of primary nursing is an empowered staff led by empowering leaders. "It [primary nursing] not only put a relationship focus on the nurses' role, it also had the effect of decentralizing power and empowering the individual at the bedside... Nurse managers and directors and vice presidents had to really make a considerable shift in their job focus -- from control to development."

The principles of primary nursing were later expanded to include people in all health care disciplines and departments, and clinicians seeing themselves as the "primary" caregiver or service provider to each patient and family became the core of the Relationship-Based Care Model of care delivery (Koloroutis, 2004). Marie Manthey's leadership has allowed the work started by the nurses on Unit 32 at the University of Minnesota Medical Center to be expanded and shared worldwide.

== Later career ==
After leaving the University of Minnesota, Manthey became Assistant Administrator and Director of Nursing at Miller Hospital as it merged with St. Lukes to become United Hospitals of Saint Paul, Minnesota. Manthey moved to New Haven, Connecticut in January 1976, and served as the Vice President of Patient Services at Yale New Haven Hospital. During that time in Connecticut she also served as associate professor at the University of Connecticut and associate clinical professor at Yale School of Nursing.

In 1978, she founded a consulting firm specializing in the organization and delivery of health care services. Originally named Creative Nursing Management, now known as Creative HealthCare Management since 2002, headquartered in Eden Prairie, Minnesota, USA.

Manthey provided technical guidance to the U.S. Department of Health and Human Services for their study of Primary Nursing, published in 1983.

Manthey remained active with the University of Minnesota School of Nursing, including serving as the President of the Nursing Alumni Society from 1999 to 2003.

Throughout her career, Manthey continued to nourish and support the profession of nursing as it continues to evolve.

"The profession of nursing must continue to define itself. .. Nurses must ask themselves some important questions.. in short, what is the nursing imperative? I would ask you to mount your own inquiry, and come up with your own answers. Here are mine:

"The nursing imperative is a two-sided coin. On one side there is the imperative to be clinically competent in both technical skills and clinical judgement. The other side is the willingness to step in to being with the human being for whom the nurse in caring. In healthcare, people experience vulnerability at every level of their being: mental, emotional, physical, and spiritual. The privilege of nursing is having the knowledge and skill, the position and relationship, to interact with a vulnerable human being in a way that alleviates pain and increases mental, emotional, physical, and spiritual comfort. This is the privilege of nursing -- the being with a vulnerable human being. If this privilege is ignored or overlooked, nursing isn't happening. No matter what is happening in a care environment, authentic human connection with the vulnerable human beings in our care can and must happen. That, to my mind, is the nursing imperative."

== Awards and honors ==
- 1994 – Marie Manthey was elected a fellow in the Royal College of Nursing in the United Kingdom, one of only four American nurses at that time.
- 1998 – Marie Manthey was elected a fellow of the American Academy of Nursing.
- 1999 – The All-University Honors Committee of the University of Minnesota awarded Marie Manthey an honorary Doctor of Laws degree by unanimous endorsement.
- 2015 – Marie Manthey was presented with the American Academy of Nursing Living Legend Award.

== Published works ==
- Wessel, S., & Manthey, M. (2015) Primary Nursing: Person-Centered Care Delivery System Design. Minneapolis, MN: Creative Health Care Management.
- Manthey, Marie (2002). The Practice of Primary Nursing. Minneapolis, MN: Creative Health Care Management. p. 1. ISBN 9781886624177.
- Manthey, Marie; Ciske, K.; Robertson, P.; Harris, I. (1970). "Primary nursing: A return to the concept of "my nurse" and "my patient". Nursing Forum 9 (1): 65–84. doi:10.1111/j.1744-6198.1970.tb00442.x.
- Manthey, Marie; Marlene Kramer (1970). "A dialogue on primary nursing". Nursing Forum 9 (4): 356–379. doi:10.1111/j.1744-6198.1970.tb01048.x.
- Manthey, Marie (1973). "Primary Care is Alive and Well in the Hospital". American Journal of Nursing 73 (1). January 1973.
- Manthey, Marie (1980). "A Theoretical Framework for Primary Nursing". Journal of Nursing Administration (JONA) 10 (6): pp 11–15. June 1980.
- Manthey, Marie (1981). "Nursing Care Plans". Nursing Management (formerly Supervisor Nurse) 12 (9). September 1981. pp 28–31.
- Manthey, Marie (1986). "Nurse Administrators' Energy Drained by Tight Money Problems". Nurse Educator 11 (1). January/February 1986.
- Manthey, Marie (1986). Management Briefs: Cutbacks and Shrinkages: A Means to Eliminate the 'Victim Mentality'. Nursing Management Vol 17, No 4. April 1986. pp 16–18.
- Manthey, Marie (1988). Primary Practice Partners (A Nurse Extender System); A Primary Practice Partner system could help solve the nursing shortage and maintain the integrity of primary nursing. Nursing Management Vol 19, No 3. March 1988. pp 58–61.
- Manthey, Marie (1988). "Marie Manthey". In Schorr, Thelma M.; Zimmerman, Anne (eds.). Making Choices, Taking Chances: Nurse Leaders Tell Their Stories. St. Louis, Missouri: The C. V. Mosby Company. ISBN 0801646111.
- Manthey, Marie (1991). "The Art of Management: Delivery Systems and Practice Models - A Dynamic Balance." Nursing Management Vol 22, No 1. January 1991. pp 28–30.
- Manthey, Marie and Melissa D. Avery (1996). "Remembering the Nurse in the Business of Advanced Practice." Advanced Practice Nursing Quarterly: The Business of Advanced Practice Nursing Vol 2, No 1, J6005. Summer 1996. pp 49–54 ISSN 1080-4293
- Gelinas L, Manthey M. 1995. Improving patient outcomes through system change: A focus on the changing roles of healthcare organization executives. Journal of Nursing Administration 25(5):55–63. [PubMed]
- Gelinas, Lillee and Marie Manthey (1997). "The Impact of Organizational Redesign on Nurse Executive Leadership." Journal of Nursing Administration Vol 27, No 10. October 1997. pp 35–42.
- Manthey, Marie (2001). "Two Miracles in One Career." Nursing Administration Quarterly Vol 25, No 2/9111126864. Winter 2001. p 55–60. ISSN 0363-9568.
- Manthey, Marie (2002). "Nursing Alumni Society News: Universal Values and the Global School of Nursing." Network [Published by the University of Minnesota School of Nursing] Vol 4, No 1. Spring/Summer 2002. p 33.
- Koloroutis, Mary (2004). Relationship-Based Care: A Model for Transforming Practice. Minneapolis, MN: Creative Health Care Management. p. 165. ISBN 9781886624191.
- Manthey, Marie (2005). Nursing Alumni Society News, A Letter from Marie Manthey, President, Alumni Society. University of Minnesota: Minnesota Nursing. Fall 2004/Winter 2005. p 22.
- Manthey, Marie (2007) "Nurse Manager as Culture Builder." Nurse Leader Magazine [Published by American Organization of Nurse Executives] Vol 5, No 4. August 2007. ISSN 1541-4612 pp 54–56.
- Manthey, Marie (2013) Foreword: Advancing Professional Nursing Practice, Relationship-Based Care and the ANA Standards of Professional Nursing Practice (anthology), edited by Margaret M. Glembocki & Joyce J. Fitzpatrick. Published by Creative HealthCare Management, 2013. ISBN 978-1-886624-88-7. pp xix - xxiii.

== See also ==
- List of Living Legends of the American Academy of Nursing
- WorldCat

== Sources ==
- Zyda, Joan (1978) 'Primary Nursing - Hospitals bring back Florence Nightingale.' Chicago Tribune (Lifestyle, Sec 5). 2/26/78.
- "The Application of Primary Nursing in a Hospital Setting" (1983). U.S. Department of Health and Human Services, Public Health Service, Health Resources and Services Administration. DHHS Publication No. HRS-P-DN-83-1.
- Villaire, Michael (1993). Interview: Marie Manthey on the Evolution of Primary Nursing. Critical Care Nurse December 1993. pp 100–107. ISSN 0279-5442
- Kalstrom, Jonathan (1994). "Nursing: It's Your Business." Minnesota Nurse Magazine Vol I, # 15, Jan 1994. pp 8–12.
- Tyler, Kate (1999). "School of Nursing Alumnae: Marie Manthey, Pathbreaking Visionary." Network [Published by the University of Minnesota School of Nursing] Vol 1, No 1. Spring/Summer 1999. pp 16–17.
- Silberg, Barbara (2002). "The Human Face of Health Care: The University's School of Nursing is a Leader in Preparing Future Nurses for the Challenges of Practice and the Delivery of Patient Care - From Addressing Workplace Issues to Applying Research Aimed at Improving the Health of People Around the World." MINNESOTA: The Magazine of the University of Minnesota Alumni Association. March/April 2002. pp 28–35.
- Williams, Sarah T (2014). "One Woman's Effort to Understand the Problem of Nursing and Addiction." MinnPost. 5/28/14.
- Steiner, Andy (2017). "New Curriculum Brings Clear-Eyed Focus to Substance-Use Disorder in Nursing." MinnPost. 4/12/17.
