= Commercial Mortgage Securities Association =

Trade organization

CRE Finance Council (formerly the Commercial Mortgage Securities Association) is a trade organization for the commercial real estate finance markets. CRE Finance focuses on six Forums, market constituencies that encompass the commercial mortgage industry. These Forums include Investment-Grade Bondholders, Issuers, Multifamily Lenders, Securities and Loan Investors, Portfolio Lenders and Servicers. CRE Finance Council represents more than 300 member companies.

The CRE Finance Council is headquartered in New York City's financial district at 30 Broad Street.

== History ==
It changed its name on March 23, 2010, to CRE Financial Council. Along with its name change, CRE Finance Council expanded its membership and focus and added six Forums, market constituencies that encompass the commercial mortgage industry.

== The Commercial Mortgage-backed Securities Industry ==
Commercial mortgage-backed securities are bonds offered to investors that are collateralized by a pool of commercial mortgage loans from which all of the principal and interest paid on those mortgages flows to investors. To create these investment vehicles, mortgage loans of varying dollar amounts, property type, and location —and containing a myriad of individualized terms and conditions — are pooled and transferred to a trust. Bonds then are issued backed by the pool of assets held in the trust. Those bonds vary in yield (the amount of return on the bonds), duration (the length of time before the bond is expected to be paid off), and payment priority (the order in which investors are paid a return on their investment). Borrowers, lenders, and investors all benefit from CMBS.

Borrowers often benefit via access both to larger pools of capital than would otherwise be available in traditional lending markets and to lower interest rates. Lenders benefit from CMBS because the securitization enables them to access the capital markets with their loan products and to obtain new bonds to make new loans. Investors benefit because CMBS creates a potentially attractive and credit-worthy investment vehicle that caters to their desired risk profile, investment term, and yield.

Commercial Mortgage Securities Association is an international trade association dedicated to improving the liquidity of commercial real estate debt securities through access to the capital markets.
