= Case management =

Case management may refer to:

- Case management (mental health), a specific approach for the coordination of community mental health services
- Case management (US health system), a specific term used in the health care system of the United States of America
- Medical case management, a general term referring to the facilitation of treatment plans to assure the appropriate medical care is provided to disabled, ill or injured individuals
- Legal case management, a set of management approaches for law firms or courts
