= Primary nursing =

System of nursing care

Primary nursing is a system of nursing care delivery that emphasizes continuity of care and responsibility acceptance by having one registered nurse (RN), often teamed with a licensed practical nurse (LPN) and/or nursing assistant (NA), who together provide complete care for a group of patients throughout their stay in a hospital unit or department. While the patient is on the nurses' unit, the primary nurse accepts responsibility for administering some and coordinating all aspects of the patient's nursing care, with the support of other members of the nursing staff. This results in the nurse having greater insight into the patient's condition, both medical and emotional.

This is distinguished from the practice of team nursing, functional nursing, or total patient care, in that primary nursing focuses on the therapeutic relationship between a patient and a named nurse who assumes responsibility for a patient's plan of care for their length of stay in a particular area. The patient is aware of who their nurse is in primary nursing, and can communicate to the entire hospital staff through that nurse. The nurse accepts responsibility for the patient's care.

It originated in 1969 by staff nurses at the University of Minnesota.

== Primary nursing description ==
A delivery system is a set of organizing principles that is used to deliver a product or service and generally consist of four elements: decision-making, work allocation, communication, and management. Primary nursing moves decision-making to the primary nurse, giving the primary nurse responsibility for the care of the patient. Results include shorter hospital stays, increased patient satisfaction, fewer medical complications, and less staff absenteeism. Work is allocated by the primary nurse to other staff in their absence, accountability remains with the primary nurse. Communication between the patient, the physician and the nurse is improved because the primary nurse is the central hub, and responsible for all communications. "All a good phsysician wants is quality care for his patient, and if primary nursing is the way to get it they are all for it", says Lawrence J. Donnelly, RN, Director of Nursing at Glendale Memorial Hospital.

== Effect on Nursing Retention ==
Shortages of qualified nurses and nursing retention issues are long-standing challenges for hospitals. Reasons for nursing turnover including dissatisfaction with the way they are required to practice nursing, in team nursing environments. (Note: A California Hospital Association study noted that 50% of nurses quit each year because of dissatisfaction with the way they are required to practice nursing.) Primary nursing grew out of a group of nurses and nurse supervisors working together to address that dissatisfaction. (Note: "This radical change in care delivery came about when a colleague, Pat Robertson (nursing supervisor) and I (assistant director of nursing) held an evening meeting with nursing staff and leaders at [my] home. This was an unprecedented and radical action—to invite staff nurses and leaders to come together to figure out how to improve patient care and the work environment itself. The nurses told stories about attempts to implement [care delivery systems like] Primary Nursing elsewhere in the United States, and we discussed how it could happen in our organization. Our message to the staff that night was that they have the ability to influence their own practice and how it will look.”) Charlotte Dison of Baptist Hospital of Miami stated that primary nursing increased nursing retention because "the nurse is more satisfied with her environment. Absenteeism tends to be less, and there is a greater commitment to the patient." Dick Otswald, Vice President Nursing at Wausau Hospitals, believed that returning nurses to direct patient care versus administrative duties would increase retention because the reason people go in to nursing is to give patient care.

== Patient experience ==
In team nursing, "the tasks got done, but patients often went home poorly taught (to take care of themselves) and the caring aspect of nursing wasn't carried out" said Karen Ciske, a former staff nurse and nursing instructor and a member of the University of Minnesota Hospitals' primary-nursing project. Ciske said that the one-to-one communication between nurse and patient is .. "where you form a relationship and patients open up to you. Not back with the charts and the pills." Patients reported satisfaction with the system because care is personalized to them. The trust relationship between the nurse and the patient is critical. "Gaining a patient's trust means they will tell me about any discomfort to changes going on in their body that the monitors might not pick up."

That patient-nurse relationship carries over to the family, and helps the nurse with discharge planning, as they're able to assess the patient's support system outside of the hospital. The patient-focused continuity of care of primary nursing also affects the patient's family. Penni Weston, primary nursing project coordinator at St. Alexius explained, "The family knows which nurse to talk to" when they have questions or anxiety about the patient's recovery. In a University of Michigan study, two groups of kidney-transplant patients were compared, one under primary nursing, the other under team nursing. The patients under team nursing experienced an average of four complications after the operation. The patients under primary nursing experienced an average of one complication after the operation, and so were able to be discharged from the hospital sooner.

== Comparison between nursing care delivery systems ==
The following table illustrates the similarities and differences between the four most common nursing care delivery systems:

Element	Functional nursing	Team nursing	Total patient care	Primary nursing
Decision-making	Decision-making occurs over a single shift; decisions usually made by nurse manager or charge nurse.	Decision-making occurs over a single shift; largely by team leader or nurse manager.	Decision-making occurs over a single shift—either by an RN caring for the patient or by a charge nurse.	RN makes decisions for individual patients based on their therapeutic relationship, which is sustained for the length of stay of the patient on the unit.
Work allocation and/or patient assignment	Nursing assignments are task-based, nurses are assigned to tasks rather than patients.	Nursing assignments are based on level of complexity and commensurate level of expertise; focus is on tasks to be accomplished; assignments change based on patient acuity and work complexity.	Nursing assignments are largely patient-based, with RN providing activities of care. Nursing assignments may vary by shift based on geography and patient acuity, without supporting continuity of care.	Nurse assignments are patient-based to ensure continuity of care. An RN is assigned to a patient and remains that patient's primary nurse for as long as the patient remains on the unit (unless circumstances require that a new primary nurse is assigned).
Communication	Communication is hierarchical; task completion is documented and communicated to the charge nurse; the charge nurse pulls information together for all patients and communicates with other members of the health care team.	Communication is hierarchical; the care provider reports to the team leader; the team leader reports to physicians and/or other health care team members.	Communication is direct. However, in some Total Patient Care systems, RNs may be required to communicate with physicians and other members of the health care team through a charge nurse.	Communication is direct. Patient information is solicited by the primary nurse who communicates directly and proactively with team members, physicians, and other colleagues. The primary nurse is responsible for integrating information and coordinating care.
Management of the unit or environment of care	Managers function as overseers, assuring that tasks are accomplished.	Nurse manager supervises the team leader who is responsible for supervising other staff in the delivery of care.	Managers serve as a resource and promote nurses having a stronger role in care decisions.	Managers promote the nurse-patient relationship and the professional role of the nurse. They influence care by creating a healthy work environment and empowering the staff to remove barriers to care.

The team nursing model is where the RN gives the patient a pill, the practical nurse changes the patient's bed linens, and the nurses' aide brings the bed pan - the RN only saw the patient that one time, when they gave the patient the pill. In primary nursing, the primary nurse gives the pill, teaches the patient about what the effects of the medication are, and monitors the patient's reaction to the medication. On discharge, the primary nurse can recommend the best time of day for the patient to take the pill, based on what they've seen during the patient's hospital stay. The primary nurse is also more alert to medication errors, because of their greater awareness of patient medication outcomes.

In the total patient care system (or modified primary nursing), the responsibility aspect of primary nursing is not implemented. However RN's do still provide more patient care than under team nursing, and have less supervisory duties over other caregivers.

== Myths and facts about primary nursing ==
The following table explores contrasting perspectives on primary nursing

Myths about primary nursing	Facts about primary nursing
Primary nursing requires an all-RN staff.	Primary nursing can be implemented with the available staff—it does not require special staff, nor does it require an all-RN staff. Licensed practical nurses, nursing assistants, and other team members play vital roles in meeting the needs of the patient and their family.
The primary nurse does all of the bedside care.	The essence of the primary nurse's role is the acceptance of responsibility, authority, and accountability for decisions about patient care. It is not about the primary nurse “doing it all.” It is simply not practical for the primary nurse to complete all aspects of care. Obvious barriers to singular care by a primary nurse include shortened length of patient stay; escalating patient acuity levels; complex, multifaceted care requirements, and the cyclical nursing shortage. Primary nurses doing all of the bedside care are not be able to assume responsibility for planning and coordinating the patient's care.
Primary nursing eliminates teamwork. Everyone works individually and therefore is not aware of patients other than their own. In a primary nursing model, care providers do not help each other.	Teamwork is critical to the primary nursing care delivery system. It has been demonstrated that the best utilization of ancillary staff is in relationship with one RN—(at least within a given shift)—not assigned to help many. However, a general culture of “helpfulness” based on a shared commitment to all patients and team members is necessary to achieve consistently safe, quality care. Primary nursing supports collaborative interdisciplinary practice through communication and coordination.
Complex scheduling requirements prohibit continuity of the nurse-patient relationship central to the primary nurse model.	Clinical staff report a 25% reduction in work redundancy due to day-to-day continuity of care. They also report a perceived increase in productivity through more consistent co-worker assignments. The key to achieving these results is to find creative methods to schedule nurses with continuity of care as the priority. For example, if a patient's anticipated length of stay is three days, schedule nurses three consecutive days.

== History ==
Primary nursing is a return to the relationship between the nurse and patient being primary, with the nurse bringing all of her professional knowledge and expertise to her care of the patient.

In the 1920s and earlier, nearly all nursing was home care nursing, in which the nurse alone managed the patient's care. Hospitals trained nurses, and those student nurses provided the care in hospitals. Once the student nurse graduated and became a professional nurse, they would be on their own professionally, managing themselves as a business with clients who required care at home. In World War II, registered nurses (RN's) were drawn into care of the wounded. The staffing available to hospitals was limited to Licensed Practical Nurses (LPN's) and Nurses Aides, so the functional model of nursing was implemented. In functional nursing, each person is assigned tasks limited by their qualifications. After the war, hospitals were built all over the US to continue to provide care to the wounded, and expand the health of the population. Functional nursing remained in place as demand for nurses constantly was greater than the supply of nurses, so the work was assigned out to various roles: orderlies, technicians, nursing assistants, practical nurses, and aides - and the Registered Nurse had oversight over all of them, rarely seeing a patient themselves. Nursing dissatisfaction and turnover was a continual problem throughout the 1950s and 1960s. The return of primary nursing started in 1969 on Unit 32 at the University of Minnesota Hospital.

The first seminar presenting primary nursing to the nursing community took place in 1970, and the first article was published that same year in Nursing Forum. A second article, "A Dialogue on Primary Nursing", was published in the journal Nursing Forum in October 1970. Throughout the 1970s, hospitals started to see the benefits of a primary nursing care delivery system to patients and nurses. In the Twin Cities, hospitals that implemented primary nursing in the 1970s included Hennepin County Medical Center, United Hospital, Bethesda Lutheran Medical Center, the Veterans Administration hospital and the University Hospital. St. Alexius implemented primary nursing in the early 1980s, crediting it with improved outcomes. The nursing staffs at Boston Beth Israel led by Joyce Clifford and Evanston Hospital led by June Werner were early adopters of primary nursing and were recognized for their outstanding work in fully implementing this professional nursing model.

Hospitals' attempts to implement primary nursing were hindered by the initially-higher costs of a more professional staff. Some hospitals initially implemented a modified version in which responsibilities are moved toward a patient focus.

== Implementation ==
As implementation of primary nursing continued, patients reported satisfaction with the system because care is personalized to them. Hospital-level resistance to primary nursing comes from the difficulty of integrating the primary nursing process within usual hospital processes. Changes required may include the nurse-doctor relationship, staffing patterns and nursing supervision practices. Changes are also required to the technical support systems underlying nursing practice. Marie Manthey asserts that a nursing system can support either professional (nursing) values or bureaucratic (hospital) values as it either focuses on caring for people or tending to the needs of an organization. “Primary nursing is a delivery system for nursing at the station level that facilitates professional nursing practice despite the bureaucratic nature of hospitals. The practice of any profession is based on an independent assessment of a client’s needs which determines the kind and amount of service to be rendered: services in bureaucracies are usually delivered according to routine pre-established procedures without sensitivity to variations in needs.” Manthey also stated that primary nursing is sometimes rejected because the nursing leader is afraid of losing authority.

The implementation of primary nursing outside of the U.S. started in England, where the term 'named nurse' was used in the National Health Service. John Major announced the Patient's Charter in 1991, one component of which was that "a named qualified nurse, midwife, or health visitor .. will be responsible for your nursing or midwifery care." In making this policy change, he stressed that Nursing was being recognized as a key component of medicine, that well-trained nurses' greater responsibilities were a benefit for the health system and for patients. While the Royal College of Nursing supported this greater role for nursing, cost challenges were also acknowledged. Stephen Wright at Tameside promoted primary nursing's benefits, while also acknowledging the challenges. The benefits Wright identified of primary nursing include reduced patient complaints, fewer medical complications, and less staff absenteeism. The discomfort of doctors working with different primary nurses, rather than one specific head nurse/ward sister is a challenge. Also, for the primary nurse, taking responsibility for the patient's care from admission to discharge requires an adequate support system. Wright said, "It can be pretty scary if you are totally responsible for a patient's care. The bus stops with you." Wright also stressed the need for adequate funding of the new system. Imperfect conditions meant that at times the ward sister (similar to Head Nurse in the U.S.) was treated as a primary nurse in some cases, meaning that Patient was given her name as their nurse. The Royal College of Nursing stated that since the named nurse concept meant "qualified staff having responsibility for designated patients", the ward sister assignment as named nurse was not realistic. Possible cost savings to support the hiring of additional qualified nurses were identified to include reducing shift change from two hours down to one, reducing supervision costs, and moving clerical and housekeeping tasks from nursing to other hospital staff members.

In the 1990s, industry consultants led a movement of hospitals into restructuring and re-engineering in the name of cost-cutting, that had the effect of reducing professional nursing autonomy and judgment by use of multi-skilled team members. The term primary nursing fell out of use, and the concepts were modified. Other changes included de-emphasis of the nurse-patient relationship. This had a negative effect on nursing satisfaction with the care they were able to provide to patients.

In the UK, hospital restructuring had the effect of spreading skilled work among a wider variety of staff. This 'changing skill mix' had the effect of increasing the managerial, medical and therapeutic work of nursing, and assigning bedside care to non-nursing staff. This grew out of 'total patient care' which involved nurses taking on additional clinical roles such as occupational therapy tasks, their work load increased accordingly. Nurses reported being concerned about qualitative differences in patient care that weren't being measured, as well as increased pressure and uncertainty due to extensive changes.

Current terminology for this practice model - 'Relationship-Based Care' - applies the original concepts of Primary Nursing to all functions and relationships within the hospital setting.

== See also ==
- Florence Nightingale
- Advanced practice nurse
- Critical care nursing
- Team nursing
