= Susan H. Lees =

Cultural anthropologist and human ecologist

- Title: Professor Emeritus of Cultural Anthropology

Academic background
- Education: PhD, University of Michigan

Academic work
- Discipline: Anthropologist
- Sub-discipline: Cultural anthropology, Human ecology
- Institutions: CUNY Graduate Center

Susan H. Lees is a cultural anthropologist and human ecologist, and the former editor-in-chief of Human Ecology and American Anthropologist. She received her PhD from the University of Michigan and is professor emeritus of cultural anthropology, human ecology, economic anthropology, and religion at Graduate Center of the City University of New York. Susan has performed field research around the world in places such as Mexico, Peru, Brazil, and Israel on historical changes to irrigation in agriculture. Additionally, her research has been published throughout her career in University Press of America, Greenwood Press, Oxford: Elsevier Science Ltd., University of North Carolina Press, and more.

== Career and research ==
Lees' work focuses mainly on ecological anthropology and economic anthropology. This research is about how people respond to a climate or environmentally based crisis like climate change, developing fishing practices, and gentrification. Her early work was largely centered around farming communities and how irrigation in agriculture can impact society and facilitate the emergence of conflict and relationships between groups. More recently, her research has explored the impact of changes in social, political, economic, and environmental developments on rural fishing communities in Maine, particularly home based crab fishing in Deer Isle, Maine and how this fishing is being threatened by regulations. This research looks at things like gentrification and education, as well as labor control and governmental power.

Throughout the last 35 years, Lee has also traveled throughout places in South America, Asia, and North America performing field research on responses to the environment.

In 1976, Lee became editor of Human Ecology, following the retirement of its founder Andrew P. Vayda. She invited Daniel Bates to co-edit the journal with her.

In 2009, Lees became the editor of American Anthropologist along with Fran Mascia-Lees.

== Works ==
- ed. Against the Grain: The Vayda Tradition in Human Ecology and Ecological Anthropology. AltaMira Press. 2009.
- The Political Ecology of the Water Crisis In Israel. University Press of America. 1999.
- Case Studies in Human Ecology. Plenum Press. 1998.
- Sociopolitical Aspects of Canal Irrigation in the Valley of Oaxaca. University of Michigan Press. 1973.
