= Technosphere (disambiguation) =

The technosphere is the global assemblage of non-living human creations.

Technosphere may also refer to:

- Technosphere (ecology), the part of Earth's environment where technodiversity influences the biosphere
- TechnoSphere (virtual environment), an online digital environment
