= Espacio y Desarrollo =

- Discipline: Geography
- Language: Spanish; exceptionally Portuguese, English, French
- Edited by: Ana Sabogal

Publication details
- History: 1989–present
- Publisher: Centro de Investigación en Geografía Aplicada de la PUCP (Peru)
- Frequency: Annually
- Open access: yes

Standard abbreviations
- ISO 4: Espac. Desarro.

Indexing
- ISSN: 1016-9148
- OCLC no.: 477673789

Links
- Journal homepage; Online archive

Espacio y Desarrollo is an annual Peruvian peer-reviewed scientific journal of geography. It was established in 1989 and is published by the Centro de Investigación en Geografía Aplicada (Pontificia Universidad Católica del Perú). The current editor-in-chief is Ana Sabogal. Espacio y Desarrollo focuses on environmental geography, linking physical geography and human geography. Contributions often highlight the human-environmental relationship. The regional focus is on Latin America.

== Abstracting and indexing ==
The journal is abstracted and indexed in ERIH PLUS, EBSCOhost and Latindex.
