= PC =

PC most commonly refers to:

- Personal computer, a general-purpose computing device for use by an individual
- IBM PC compatible, a personal computer that is hardware- and software-compatible with the IBM Personal Computer
- Political correctness, language or behavior that avoids being offensive
- Player character or playable character, a fictional person controlled by and representing a participant in a game
- Police Constable, a rank of law enforcement officer

PC or pc may also refer to:

== Arts and entertainment ==
- Pitch class, a set of octave-equivalent pitches in music
- Player character or playable character, a fictional person controlled by and representing a participant in a game
- Port Charles, an American daytime TV soap opera
- Production code number, a designation used to identify television episodes
- Pretty Cure, a Japanese anime franchise

== Business and finance ==
- Percentage (pc)
- Prime cost or variable cost
- Principal Consultant, a management consulting position
- Professional corporation, a type of corporate entity for licensed professionals (attorneys, architects, physicians, engineers, etc.)

== Organizations ==
=== Businesses ===
- Pearl-Continental Hotels & Resorts, a hotel chain in Pakistan
- Pirelli & C. S.p.A. (stock symbol PC), an Italian multinational tyre manufacturer
- President's Choice, a private label product brand of the Canadian supermarket chain Loblaw Companies
  - PC Mobile, a Canadian mobile virtual network operator
  - PC Optimum, a Canadian rewards program
  - PC Express, a grocery click and collect service
  - President's Choice Financial, a Canadian financial services provider

=== Government bodies ===
- Peace Corps, a volunteer program run by the US government
- Philippine Constabulary, a defunct police force
- Libyan Presidential Council
- Privy council, a body that advises the head of state of a nation, or the postnominal used by its members
  - King's Privy Council for Canada
  - Privy Council of the United Kingdom
- Putnam City Schools, school district in Oklahoma

=== Political parties ===
- Colorado Party (disambiguation)
- Partido Comunista (disambiguation)
- Partidul Conservator, a Romanian conservative party
- Plaid Cymru, a Welsh nationalist political party
- Porozumienie Centrum, a now-defunct Polish right-wing political party
- Progressive Conservative Party of Canada, a defunct Canadian federal political party
  - Progressive Canadian Party, a party made up of former members of the Progressive Conservative party
- Several current and former provincial political parties of Canada:
  - Progressive Conservative Association of Alberta (1905–2017)
  - Progressive Conservative Party of New Brunswick (1867– )
  - Progressive Conservative Party of Manitoba (1882- )
  - Progressive Conservative Party of Newfoundland and Labrador (1949– )
  - Progressive Conservative Association of Nova Scotia (1867– )
  - Progressive Conservative Party of Ontario (1854– )
  - Progressive Conservative Party of Prince Edward Island (1851– )
  - Progressive Conservative Party of Quebec (1982–1989)
  - Protestant Coalition, Ulster loyalist political party in Northern Ireland (2013-2015)
  - Yukon Progressive Conservative Party (1978–1991)

=== Religious denominations ===
- Presbyterian Church
- Presbyterian Church (U.S.A.)

=== Schools ===
==== American schools ====
- Phoenix College, a community college in Arizona
- Pomona College, a liberal arts college in Claremont, California
- Port Charlotte High School, in Florida
- Presbyterian College, in Clinton, South Carolina
- Providence College, in Rhode Island
- Putnam City Schools, school district in Oklahoma

==== Schools elsewhere ====
- ESPCI (also referred to as Physique-Chimie), an engineering school in France
- Pembroke College, Oxford, a constituent college of the University of Oxford, in England
- Pickering College, an independent, co-educational K-12 school in Newmarket, Ontario, Canada
- Port Credit Secondary School, in Mississauga, Ontario, Canada
- Prempeh College, in Ashanti Region, Ghana

== Law ==
- Police Constable, a rank of law enforcement officer
- Protective custody, a type of imprisonment or care to protect a person from harm
- Probable cause, reasonable grounds (for making a search, pressing a charge, etc.)
- Police commissioner, the chief manager of a police entity
- Penal code, the legal code in some jurisdictions that define crimes
- President's Counsel, a lawyer's rank in Sri Lanka

== People ==
- PC (footballer) (born 1994), from Brazil
- PC Siqueira (1986–2023), Brazilian YouTuber, presenter and comic book colourist
- Priscilla Chan (singer) (born 1965), Hong Kong Cantopop singer
- Priyanka Chopra, an Indian actress, model and singer

== Places ==
=== United States ===
- Park City, Utah
- Panama City, Florida
- Panorama City, Los Angeles, a district in the San Fernando Valley
- Port Charlotte, Florida
- Port Chester, New York

=== Other places ===
- Pacific Centre, a shopping mall in Vancouver, British Columbia
- Pacific Coast
- Pacific Islands Trust Territory (ISO 3166 country code)
- Panama City, the capital of Panama
- Pitcairn Islands (FIPS PUB 10-4 territory code)
- Port Credit, a neighbourhood of Mississauga, Ontario, Canada
- Serbia or the Republika Srpska, both of which can be abbreviated in Cyrillic to РС (RS)

== Science, technology, and mathematics ==
=== Chemistry ===
- Phosphatidylcholine, a phospholipid
- Polycarbonate, a plastic polymer
- Propylene carbonate, a polar organic solvent
- Pyruvate carboxylase, an enzyme

=== Computing ===
- Personal computer, a general-purpose computing device for use by an individual
  - Specifically, the IBM Personal Computer (IBM PC), released in 1981, or a related meaning:
    - List of IBM Personal Computer models
    - IBM PC compatible
    - "PC", a computer running the Wintel hardware–software stack
    - "PC", a computer running the Microsoft Windows operating system
  - Portable computer
- Programmable controller (disambiguation)
- Pica (unit) (pc), a typographic unit of measure
- Program counter, a special register inside CPUs

=== Mathematics ===
- Path connected, a concept in mathematical topology
- Precalculus, a level in math education
- Polynomial chaos, a concept in stochastic mathematics
- Principal component

=== Medicine and psychology ===
==== Anatomical structures ====
- Posterior commissure, a brain landmark commonly used in biomedical image processing
- Pubococcygeus muscle, or pelvic floor muscle
- Parietal cell

==== Diseases ====
- Pachyonychia congenita, a genetic skin disorder
- Pancreatic cancer
- Prostate cancer

==== Other uses in medicine and psychology ====
- Palliative care, specialised care for people with serious illnesses
- Perceived control, a psychological concept
- Post cibum (Latin for "after food"), in medical prescriptions
- Primary care
- Phase contrast magnetic resonance imaging

=== Physics and cosmology ===
- Parsec (pc), a unit of distance used in astronomy
- Picocoulomb (pC), a unit of electrostatic charge
- Petacoulomb (PC), a unit of electrostatic charge
- Photonic crystal, a photonic band gap material
- Pc (space group), three-dimensional space group number 7

=== Other uses in science and technology ===
- PC, a type of Mazda C engine
- Prestressed concrete, a method for overcoming concrete's natural weakness in tension
- Progressive contextualization, a scientific method
- Prontor-Compur, a standard connector type for photographic flash synchronization
- Perspective Control, photographic lens arrangement for reducing keystone distortion

== Transport ==
- Patrol craft, a small naval vessel generally designed for coastal defence duties
- Penn Central, a railroad in the US
- Two US Navy hull classification symbols: Patrol craft (PC) and Patrol craft coastal (PC)
- Pegasus Airlines (IATA code: PC)
- Pachora Junction railway station (station code: PC), Maharashtra, India

== Other uses ==
- Pickleball Canada, Canada's governing body for the sport of pickleball
- Political correctness, language or behavior that avoids being offensive
- Pro-choice, the view that women should have the choice of whether or not to terminate a pregnancy
- Proto-Celtic, the reconstructed common ancestor of the Celtic languages

== See also ==
- Piece (disambiguation)
- P.C. Hooftstraat, a street in Amsterdam, Netherlands
- Tandy Pocket Computer
- PCS (disambiguation)
