= Caroline Hunt =

Caroline Hunt may refer to:

- Caroline Rose Hunt (1923–2018), American heiress and hotelier
- Caroline Hunt (home economist) (1865–1927), American home economist
