= Pisi =

Pisi may refer to:

- Pişi, a type of fried dough in Central Asian and Middle Eastern cuisine
- PISI, Linux software package
- π_{c} capillary oncotic pressure in the Starling equation

== The Pisi brothers ==
- Tusi Pisi (b. 1982), Samoan international rugby union player
- George Pisi (b. 1986), Samoan rugby union player
- Ken Pisi (b. 1989), Samoan rugby union player

== See also ==
- Pici, hand-rolled pasta
- PC (disambiguation)
