= School of Human Ecology (University of Wisconsin–Madison) =

The School of Human Ecology is a school at the University of Wisconsin in Madison, Wisconsin. The school has both graduate and undergraduate programs. The departments are Consumer Science, Design Studies, Civil Society & Community Studies, and Human Development & Family Studies. The school has more than 2,400 undergraduates working towards majors, and 100 graduate students.

== Academics ==
=== Undergraduate education ===
The school offers undergraduate majors in Consumer Behavior & Marketplace Studies; Community & Nonprofit Leadership; Human Development & Family Studies; Interior Architecture; Personal Finance; Textiles & Fashion Design.

Each major is based on a background of course work in the arts and humanities, the social sciences, and the biological, physical, and natural sciences. The focus of undergraduate professional programs may be in scientific, aesthetic, and/or business areas.

=== Graduate education ===
The School awards a Ph.D. in Human Ecology with four named options in Civil Society & Community Research, Consumer Behavior and Family Economics, Design Studies, and Human Development and Family Studies. It also awards an M.F.A. in Design Studies and an M.S. in Human Ecology.

== History ==
The University of Wisconsin-Madison School of Human Ecology dates to the spring of 1903. With support from women's organizations around the state, the University Board of Regents, and Belle Case La Follette (the governor's wife), the state legislature funded the establishment of the Department of Home Economics. On June 16, 1903, Caroline Hunt became its first professor. Over time, the department expanded to serve the needs of the university and surrounding community. One outreach effort was the creation of the Dorothy Roberts Nursery School in response to a request from area mothers in 1926. The department also added and developed new and more focused majors such as foods and nutrition, textiles, applied bacteriology, related art, and home economics journalism. All of this occurred under the direction of Abby Marlett. After taking over from Abby Marlett in 1939, Frances Zuill worked to further develop the department, so that it became the School of Home Economics within the College of Agriculture. The school continued to grow and became a separate unit, autonomous from the College of Agriculture in 1973. The original Department of Home Economics underwent several name changes over the years, most recently changing from the School of Family Resources and Consumer Economics to its current name, the School of Human Ecology, in 1996.

The $1.8-million Southern Wisconsin Child Welfare Training Project provides training to all the social workers in child protective services in the 21 southern tier counties of the state. The Badger Care project, a collaborative to implement the State Children's Health Insurance Program (SCHIP) for Wisconsin, develops and evaluates more effective means to enroll children from families of modest means in this essential health insurance program.

== Statistics ==
- Established: 1903
- Type: State University
- Dean: Dean Soyeon Shim
- Location: Madison, Wisconsin, USA
- Campus: Urban
- Website: http://www.sohe.wisc.edu/
- Size and Student Population (as of 2009):
- Approximately 900 undergraduate students have majors in Human Ecology
- Approximately 100 graduate students are working toward advanced degrees in Consumer Behavior and Family Economics, Human Development and Family Studies, and Design Studies
- A total of 14.2 percent of undergraduate and graduate students represent minority populations.
- A total of 131 participated in UW-Madison study abroad programs, an increase of 37 percent over the past three years.

== See also ==
- University of Wisconsin
- Human ecology
