= PCS =

PCS may refer to:

== Government ==
- Prime Cabinet Secretary, of the Republic of Kenya
- Provincial Civil Service (disambiguation), state civil services in India

== Military ==
- Permanent change of station, to be permanently moved to a new post in the U.S. armed forces
- Personal Clothing System, designation of British Army No. 8 Combat Dress
- Patrol craft sweeper, a US Navy hull classification symbol; see List of patrol vessels of the United States Navy

== Organizations ==
- Communist Party of El Salvador (Spanish: Partido Comunista de El Salvador), a political party in El Salvador
- PhillyCarShare, a defunct non-profit organization in Philadelphia, US, acquired by Enterprise in 2011
- Polish Council of State, supreme political body of Poland from 1947 to 1989
- Portland Center Stage, a theater company based in Portland, Oregon, US since 1988
- PotashCorp Corporation of Saskatchewan, a former Canadian producer of potash
- Provo Canyon School, a US psychiatric youth residential treatment center
- Public and Commercial Services Union, a trade union representing UK public sector workers
- Sammarinese Communist Party (Italian: Partito Comunista Sammarinese), a former political party in San Marino

=== Education ===
- Pacific Collegiate School, a grades 7–12 charter school in Santa Cruz, California, US
- Petaluma City Schools, the school district of Petaluma, California, US
- Presbyterian Christian School, a private school in Hattiesburg, Mississippi, US
- Professional Children's School, a college preparatory school for child actors and dancers in New York City, US
- Pueblo City Schools, the school district of Pueblo, Colorado, US

== Science and technology ==
- Partitioning Communication System, a high-assurance communications security technology
- Periphere Computer Systeme, a German manufacturer of UNIX-based computers in the 1980s and 1990s
- Personal Communications Service, a set of wireless communications capabilities
- Photon correlation spectroscopy, a spectroscopic technique in chemistry and physics used to determine particle sizes in suspensions
- Physical coding sublayer, an Ethernet Layer 1 (PHY) sub-layer
- Picture communication symbols, drawings used to communicate with autistic people and in other alternative communication systems
- Plastic-clad silica fiber, a type of optical fiber
- Process control system, for industrial process control
- Profile connection space, an intermediary form for color-data used when performing conversions between color spaces

=== Medicine ===
- Pelvic congestion syndrome, a cause of chronic pain in the abdomen
- Post-concussion syndrome, a set of symptoms that a person may experience after a concussion
- Postcholecystectomy syndrome, the presence of abdominal symptoms after surgery to remove the gallbladder
- Precordial catch syndrome, a common cause of chest pain complaints in children and adolescents

== Other uses ==
- Pacific Central Station, a railway station in Vancouver, British Columbia, Canada
- Pacific Championship Series, a professional esports league for the MOBA PC game League of Legends
- Photo City Sagamihara, awards for photography given annually by the Japanese town of Sagamihara
- Pinball Construction Set, a computer game by Bill Budge published by Electronic Arts
- Program Component Score, part of the ISU Judging System for figure skating competitions

== See also ==
- Parsec (pc), a unit of distance used in astronomy
- Personal computer (PCs)
- PC (disambiguation)
