= Daniel Bates =

American anthropologist

Daniel G. Bates is an anthropologist and human ecologist. He is professor emeritus of anthropology at Department of Anthropology, Hunter College, CUNY. He is also the editor-in-chief of Human Ecology.

== Education and early research ==
Between 1968 and 1971, Bates conducted ecological fieldwork in Turkey and the Middle East. He received his PhD from University of Michigan in 1971. His doctoral dissertation The Yoruk of Southeastern Turkey: A Study of Social Organization and Land Use was based on fieldwork in Turkey with the Yörüks. It was published in 1973 by University of Michigan Press as Nomads and Farmers: A Study of the Yörük of Southeastern Turkey.

== Career ==
Bates' research focuses on the intersection of anthropology, ecology and human culture. Much of his early research focused on nomadic groups in Turkey and West Asia, including adaptive culture, intergroup exchange, systems of pastoralism, and marriage patterns among the Yörük. He has also done research on ethnic minorities in the Balkans and Eastern Europe.

In 1976, Bates was invited by Susan H. Lees to co-edit the journal Human Ecology, after Andrew P. Vayda retired from the role. That year, he also Bates co-authored Anthropology: Decisions, adaptation, and evolution with Fred Plog and Clifford J. Jolly.

He co-edited Case Studies in Human Ecology with Lees in 1996, which was a collection of studies previously published in Human Ecology. In 1998, he published Human Adaptive Strategies: Ecology, Culture and Politics. Between 1998 and 2002, he also taught at Istanbul Bilgi University.

Bates co-authored Human Adaptive Strategies An Ecological Introduction to Anthropology (2023) with Judith Tucker and Ludomir Lozny.

== Works ==
- Cultural Anthropology (3rd Edition)
- Human Adaptive Strategies: Ecology, Culture, and Politics (3rd Edition)
- Peoples and Cultures of the Middle East (2nd Edition)
- Human Adaptive Strategies
- Human Ecology. Contemporary Research and Practice. Springer 2010
