= Gerald L. Young =

American ecologist

- Known for: A recognized leader in scholarly publications in human, fourth president of the Society for Human Ecology (1988-1990)
- Scientific career
- Fields: Human ecology
- Workplaces: Washington State University

Gerald L. Young is an ecologist who has published and is best known for his work in human ecology. He is a professor of biology and environmental science and regional planning at Washington State University. and was past president (1988-1990) of the Society for Human Ecology. The Society for Human Ecology offers the Gerald L. Young book award.

== Publications ==
- Young, G.L. (1974). "Human ecology as an interdisciplinary concept: A critical inquiry". Advances in Ecological Research. 8: 1–105. doi:10.1016/S0065-2504(08)60277-9. ISBN 9780120139088.
- Young, G.L. (1975). "Environmental law: Perspectives from human ecology". Journal of Environmental Law and Practice. 6: 298. ISSN 1181-7534.
- Young, G. L. (Ed.) (1983). Origins of Human Ecology. Hutchinson Ross Publishing Company, Stroudsburg, Pennsylvania.
- Young, G. L. (Ed.) (1986). Human Ecology: A Gathering of Perspectives
- Young, G. L. (1986). "Environment: Term and concept in the social sciences". Social Science Information. 25: 83–124. doi:10.1177/053901886025001006. S2CID 145405201.
- Young, G. L. (1989). A Conceptual Framework for an Interdisciplinary Human Ecology. Acta Oecologiae Hominis, 1, 1–135.
- Young, G.L. (1994). The case for a ’catholic’ ecology. Human Ecology Review 2, 310–319.
- Young, G.L. (1996). Interaction as a concept basic to human ecology: An exploration and synthesis. Advances in Human Ecology 5, 157–211.
- Young, G.L. (1998). Holism: Writ and riposte in ecology and human ecology. Advances in Human Ecology 7, 313–365.
- Young, G.L. (1999). A piece of the main: Parts and wholes in human ecology. Advances in Human Ecology 8, 1–31.
- Young, G. L.; Steiner, F.; Brooks, K.; Struckmeyer, K. (1983). "Determining the regional context for landscape planning". Landscape Planning. 10 (4): 269–296. doi:10.1016/0304-3924(83)90037-0.
- Young, G. L., Steiner, F., Brooks, K. and Struckmeyer, K. (1994) Planning the built environment: Determining the regional context. In The Built Environment: A Creative Inquiry into Design and Planning (Tom J. Bartuska and Gerald L. Young, eds.). Crisp Publications, Menlo Park, California.
