= Nutrient cycle =

Set of processes exchanging nutrients between parts of a system

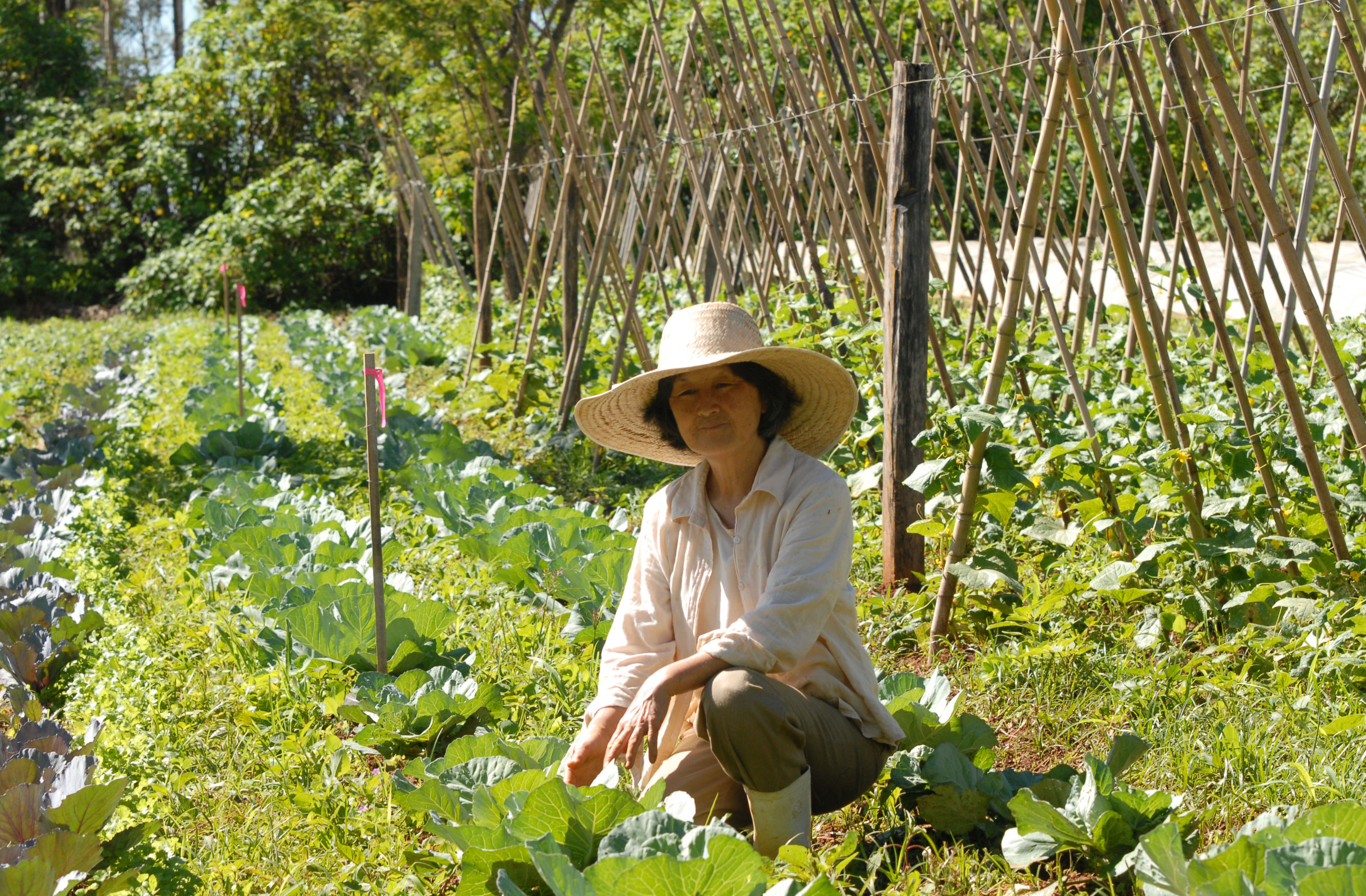
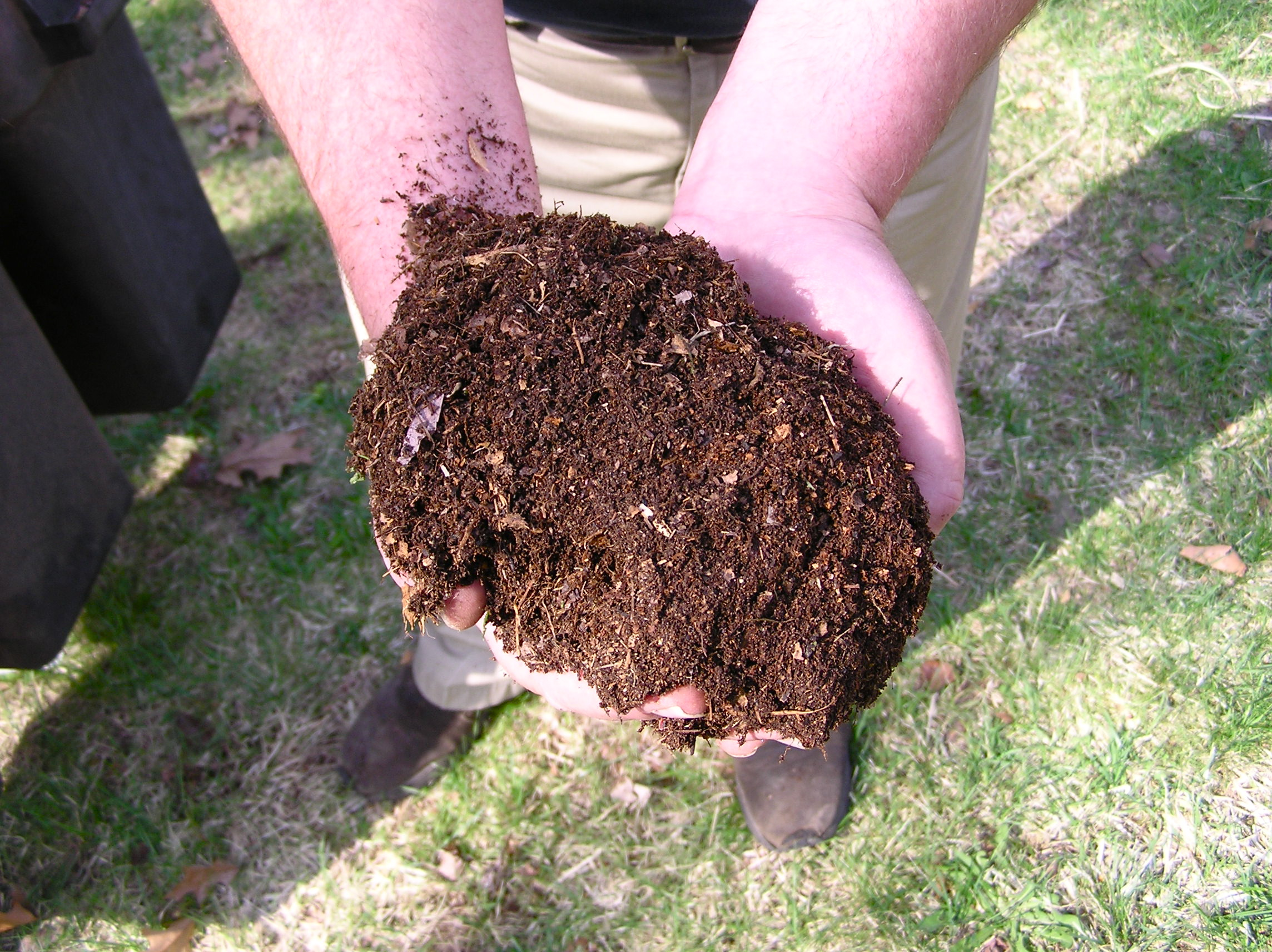
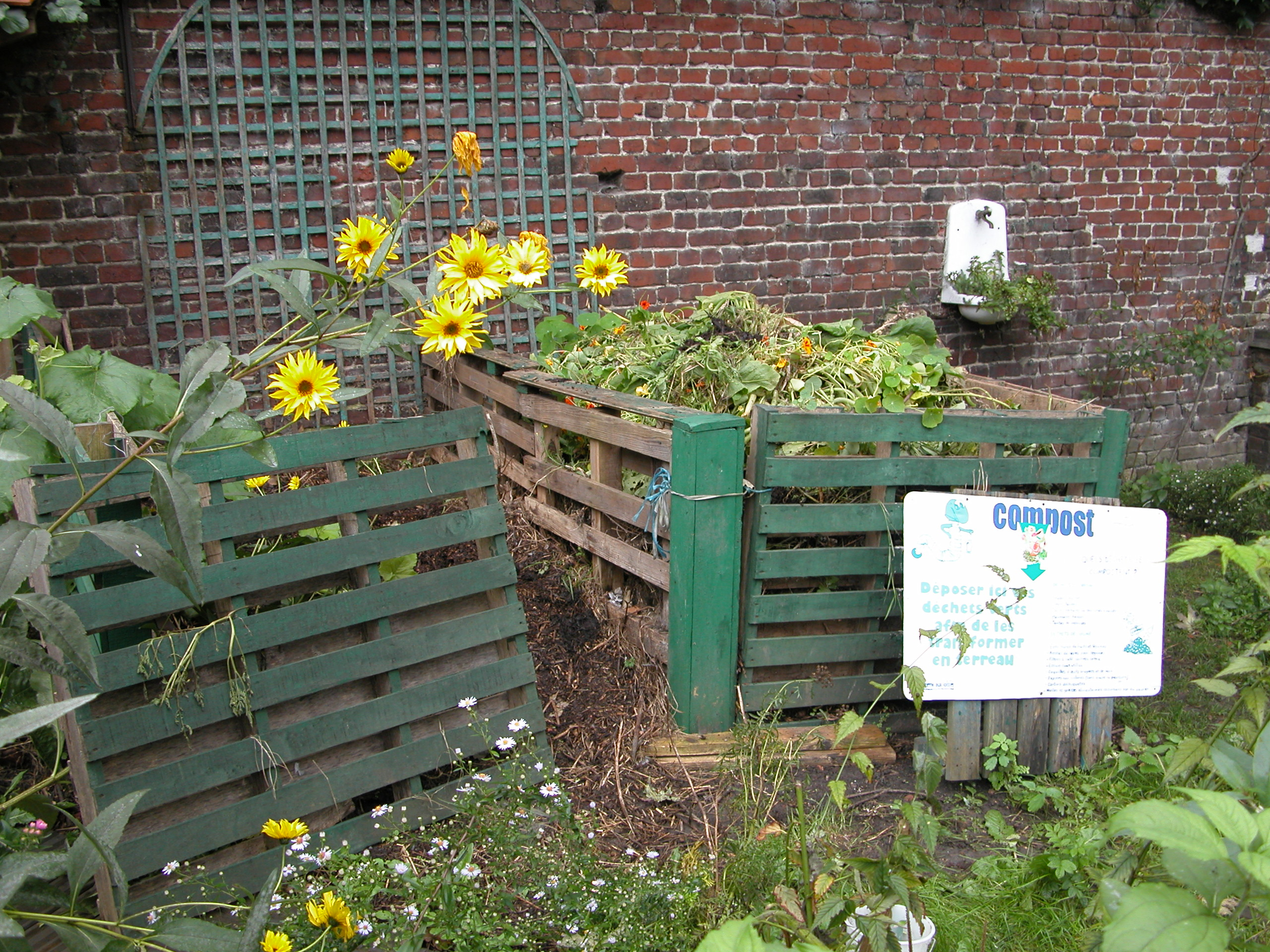
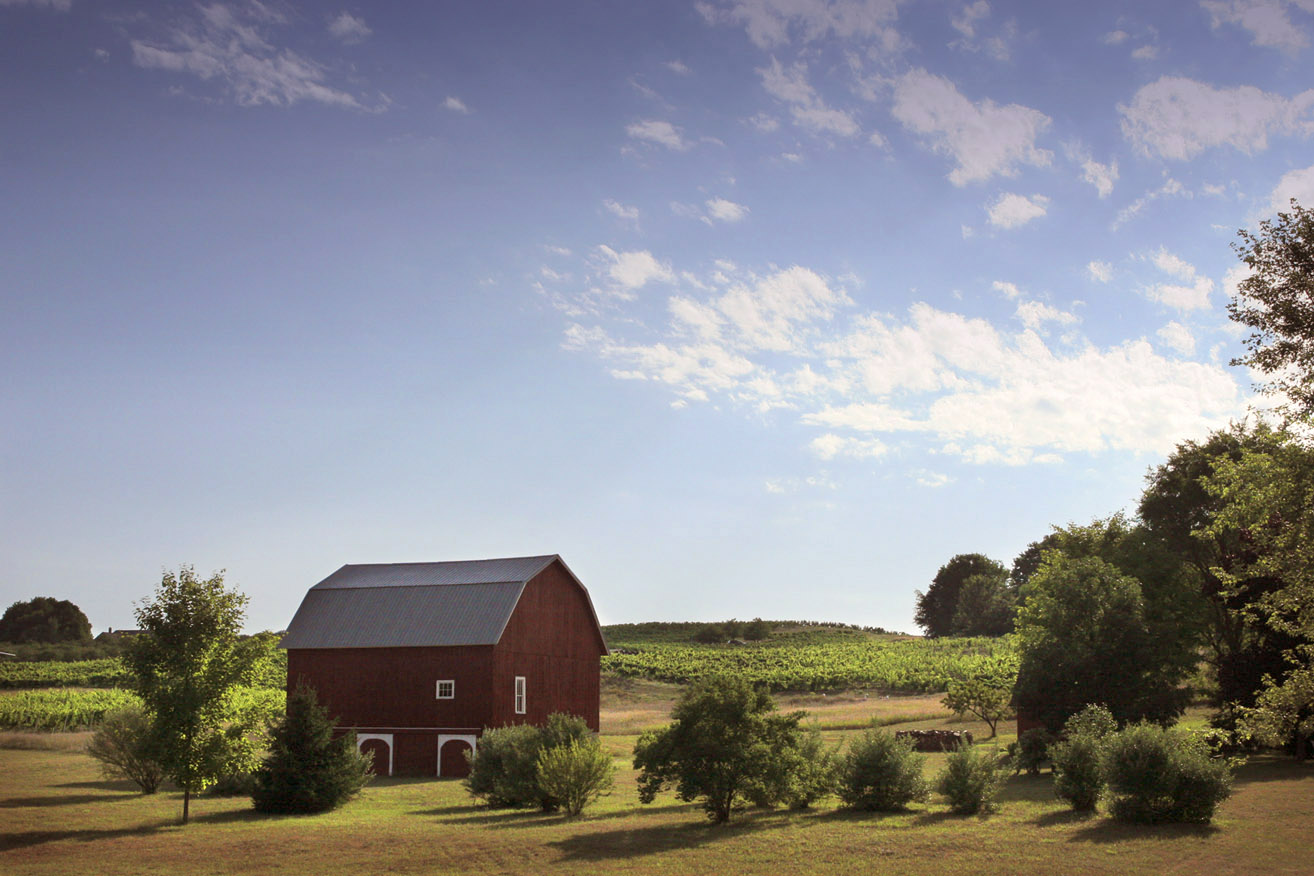
Composting within agricultural systems capitalizes upon the natural services of nutrient recycling in ecosystems. Bacteria, fungi, insects, earthworms, bugs, and other creatures dig and digest the compost into fertile soil. The minerals and nutrients in the soil is recycled back into the production of crops.

A nutrient cycle (or ecological recycling) is the movement and exchange of inorganic and organic matter back into the production of matter. Energy flow is a unidirectional and noncyclic pathway, whereas the movement of mineral nutrients is cyclic. Mineral cycles include the carbon cycle, sulfur cycle, nitrogen cycle, water cycle, phosphorus cycle, oxygen cycle, among others that continually recycle along with other mineral nutrients into productive ecological nutrition.

== Overview ==
The nutrient cycle is nature's recycling system. All forms of recycling have feedback loops that use energy in the process of putting material resources back into use. Recycling in ecology is regulated to a large extent during the process of decomposition. Ecosystems employ biodiversity in the food webs that recycle natural materials, such as mineral nutrients, which includes water. Recycling in natural systems is one of the many ecosystem services that sustain and contribute to the well-being of human societies.

There is much overlap between the terms for the biogeochemical cycle and nutrient cycle. Most textbooks integrate the two and seem to treat them as synonymous terms. However, the terms often appear independently. The nutrient cycle is more often used in direct reference to the idea of an intra-system cycle, where an ecosystem functions as a unit. From a practical point, it does not make sense to assess a terrestrial ecosystem by considering the full column of air above it as well as the great depths of Earth below it. While an ecosystem often has no clear boundary, as a working model it is practical to consider the functional community where the bulk of matter and energy transfer occurs. Nutrient cycling occurs in ecosystems that participate in the "larger biogeochemical cycles of the earth through a system of inputs and outputs."

All systems recycle. The biosphere is a network of continually recycling materials and information in alternating cycles of convergence and divergence. As materials converge or become more concentrated they gain in quality, increasing their potentials to drive useful work in proportion to their concentrations relative to the environment. As their potentials are used, materials diverge, or become more dispersed in the landscape, only to be concentrated again at another time and place.

== Complete and closed loop ==
Nutrient cycle of a typical terrestrial ecosystem

Ecosystems are capable of complete recycling. Complete recycling means that 100% of the waste material can be reconstituted indefinitely. This idea was captured by Howard T. Odum when he penned that "it is thoroughly demonstrated by ecological systems and geological systems that all the chemical elements and many organic substances can be accumulated by living systems from background crustal or oceanic concentrations without limit as to concentration so long as there is available solar or another source of potential energy" In 1979 Nicholas Georgescu-Roegen proposed the fourth law of entropy stating that complete recycling is impossible. Despite Georgescu-Roegen's extensive intellectual contributions to the science of ecological economics, the fourth law has been rejected in line with observations of ecological recycling. However, some authors state that complete recycling is impossible for technological waste.

Ecosystems execute closed loop recycling where demand for the nutrients that adds to the growth of biomass exceeds supply within that system. There are regional and spatial differences in the rates of growth and exchange of materials, where some ecosystems may be in nutrient debt (sinks) where others will have extra supply (sources). These differences relate to climate, topography, and geological history leaving behind different sources of parent material. In terms of a food web, a cycle or loop is defined as "a directed sequence of one or more links starting from, and ending at, the same species." An example of this is the microbial food web in the ocean, where "bacteria are exploited, and controlled, by protozoa, including heterotrophic microflagellates which are in turn exploited by ciliates. This grazing activity is accompanied by excretion of substances which are in turn used by the bacteria so that the system more or less operates in a closed circuit."

== Ecological recycling ==
A simplified food web illustrating a three-trophic food chain (producers-herbivores-carnivores) linked to decomposers. The movement of mineral nutrients through the food chain, into the mineral nutrient pool, and back into the trophic system illustrates ecological recycling. The movement of energy, in contrast, is unidirectional and noncyclic.

An example of ecological recycling occurs in the enzymatic digestion of cellulose. "Cellulose, one of the most abundant organic compounds on Earth, is the major polysaccharide in plants where it is part of the cell walls. Cellulose-degrading enzymes participate in the natural, ecological recycling of plant material." Different ecosystems can vary in their recycling rates of litter, which creates a complex feedback on factors such as the competitive dominance of certain plant species. Different rates and patterns of ecological recycling leave a legacy of environmental effects with implications for the future evolution of ecosystems.

A large fraction of the elements composing living matter reside at any instant of time in the world's biota. Because the earthly pool of these elements is limited and the rates of exchange among the various components of the biota are extremely fast with respect to geological time, it is quite evident that much of the same material is being incorporated again and again into different biological forms. This observation gives rise to the notion that, on the average, matter (and some amounts of energy) are involved in cycles.

Ecological recycling is common in organic farming, where nutrient management is fundamentally different compared to agri-business styles of soil management. Organic farms that employ ecosystem recycling to a greater extent support more species (increased levels of biodiversity) and have a different food web structure. Organic agricultural ecosystems rely on the services of biodiversity for the recycling of nutrients through soils instead of relying on the supplementation of synthetic fertilizers.

The model for ecological recycling agriculture adheres to the following principles:

- Protection of biodiversity.
- Use of renewable energy.
- Recycling of plant nutrients.

Where produce from an organic farm leaves the farm gate for the market the system becomes an open cycle and nutrients may need to be replaced through alternative methods.

=== Influence of trophic interactions on nutrient cycling in freshwater systems ===
Trophic interactions also play a crucial role in regulating nutrient cycling, especially in freshwater systems. They not only alter how nutrients, such as nitrogen (N) and phosphorus (P), are distributed and the rate at which they are recycled in these systems, but also can determine which species are most dominant by doing so. Predators can indirectly influence nutrient availability through top-down control of herbivores, thereby affecting primary production and nutrient uptake. One of the more important mechanisms linking foodwebs to nutrient cycling is the trophic relationship of planktovorous fish, zooplankton, and phytoplankton. When zooplankton populations are high, they consume phytoplankton at a greater rate, thereby limiting the incorporation of nitrogen and phosphorus into organic matter. As a consequence, inorganic forms of nitrogen, such as ammonium (NH₄⁺) and dissolved phosphorus in the form of phosphate (PO₄³⁻), are kept at a higher concentration in the water column. Under these conditions, organisms such as nitrogen-fixing cyanobacteria will be less competitive since inorganic nitrogen is already abundant, favoring species that depend on direct uptake of ammonium or nitrate. Meanwhile, increased inorganic phosphorus in the water favors those plankton species that are more efficient at uptaking this limiting nutrient. If fewer predators are feeding on zooplankton in the system, species such as Daphnia will have a competitive advantage because of their larger size and higher phosphorus requirement for growth. In contrast, if the zooplankton population is regulated by an increase in planktovorous fish numbers, phytoplankton can more easily proliferate and assimilate large amounts of nitrogen and phosphorus into their biomass, reducing the availability of these nutrients in their bioavailable forms. Consumers such as zooplankton and fish also excrete ammonium as a waste product and phosphate during metabolic processes. These can be directly taken in by primary producers, making this consumer-driven internal cycling of nutrients another important source of the redistribution of nutrients in freshwater systems.

=== Ecosystem engineers ===
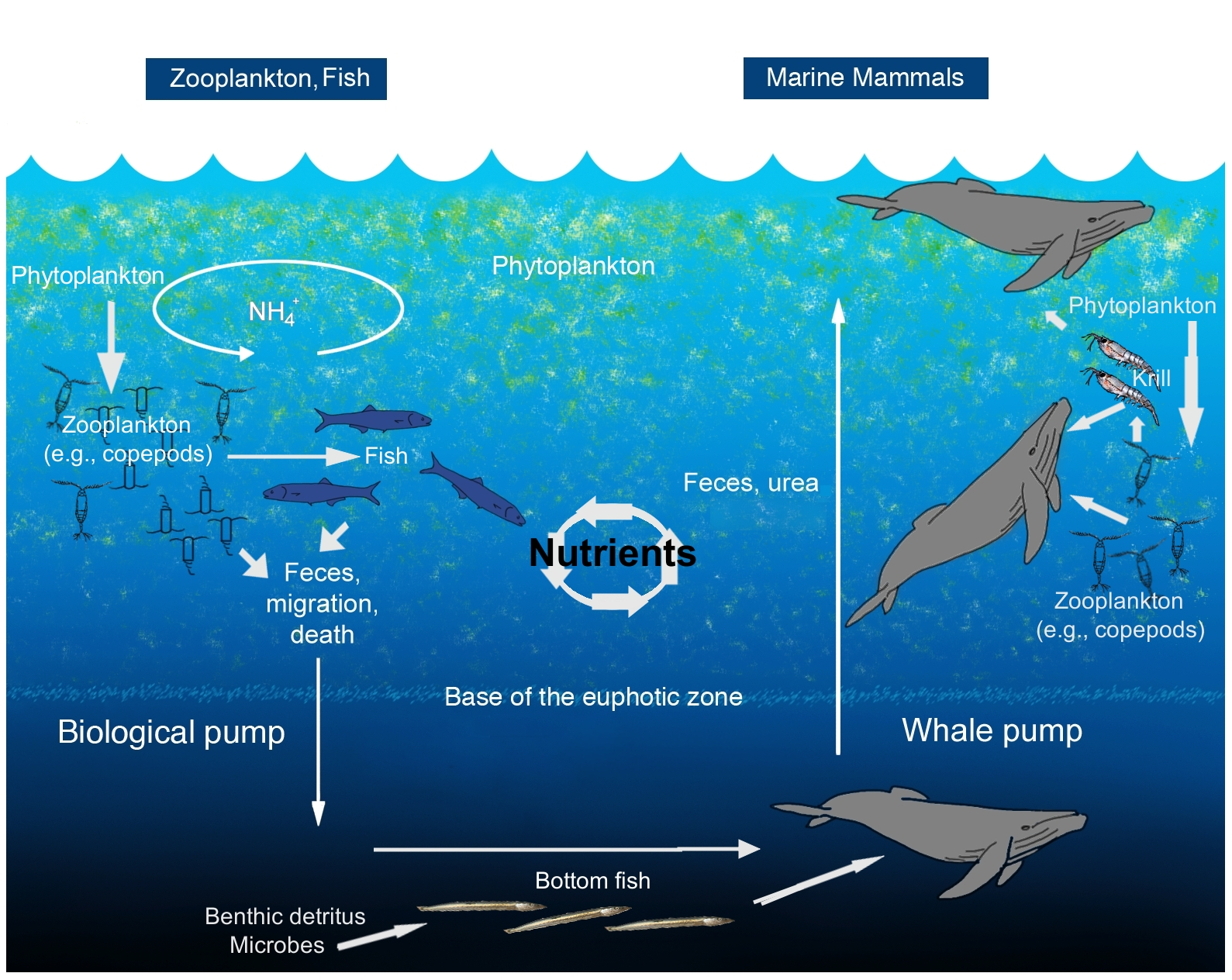
From the largest to the smallest of creatures, nutrients are recycled by their movement, by their wastes, and by their metabolic activities. This illustration shows an example of the whale pump that cycles nutrients through the layers of the oceanic water column. Whales can migrate to great depths to feed on bottom fish (such as sand lance Ammodytes spp.) and surface to feed on krill and plankton at shallower levels. The whale pump enhances growth and productivity in other parts of the ecosystem.

The persistent legacy of environmental feedback that is left behind by or as an extension of the ecological actions of organisms is known as niche construction or ecosystem engineering. Many species leave an effect even after their death, such as coral skeletons or the extensive habitat modifications to a wetland by a beaver, whose components are recycled and re-used by descendants and other species living under a different selective regime through the feedback and agency of these legacy effects. Ecosystem engineers can influence nutrient cycling efficiency rates through their actions.

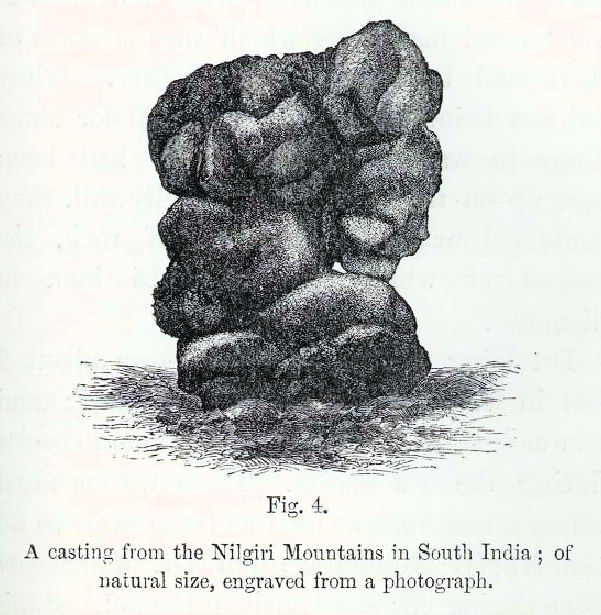
An illustration of an earthworm casting taken from Charles Darwin's publication on the movement of organic matter in soils through the ecological activities of worms.

Earthworms, for example, passively and mechanically alter the nature of soil environments. The bodies of dead worms passively contribute mineral nutrients to the soil. The worms also mechanically modify the physical structure of the soil as they crawl about (bioturbation) and digest on the molds of organic matter they pull from the soil litter. These activities transport nutrients into the mineral layers of soil. Worms discard wastes that create worm castings containing undigested materials where bacteria and other decomposers gain access to the nutrients. The earthworm is employed in this process and the production of the ecosystem depends on their capability to create feedback loops in the recycling process.

Shellfish are also ecosystem engineers because they: 1) Filter suspended particles from the water column; 2) Remove excess nutrients from coastal bays through denitrification; 3) Serve as natural coastal buffers, absorbing wave energy and reducing erosion from boat wakes, sea level rise and storms; 4) Provide nursery habitat for fish that are valuable to coastal economies.

Fungi contribute to nutrient cycling and nutritionally rearrange patches of ecosystem creating niches for other organisms. In that way, fungi growing on dead wood allow xylophages to grow and develop, and in turn, affect dead wood, contributing to wood decomposition and nutrient cycling in the forest floor.

== History ==
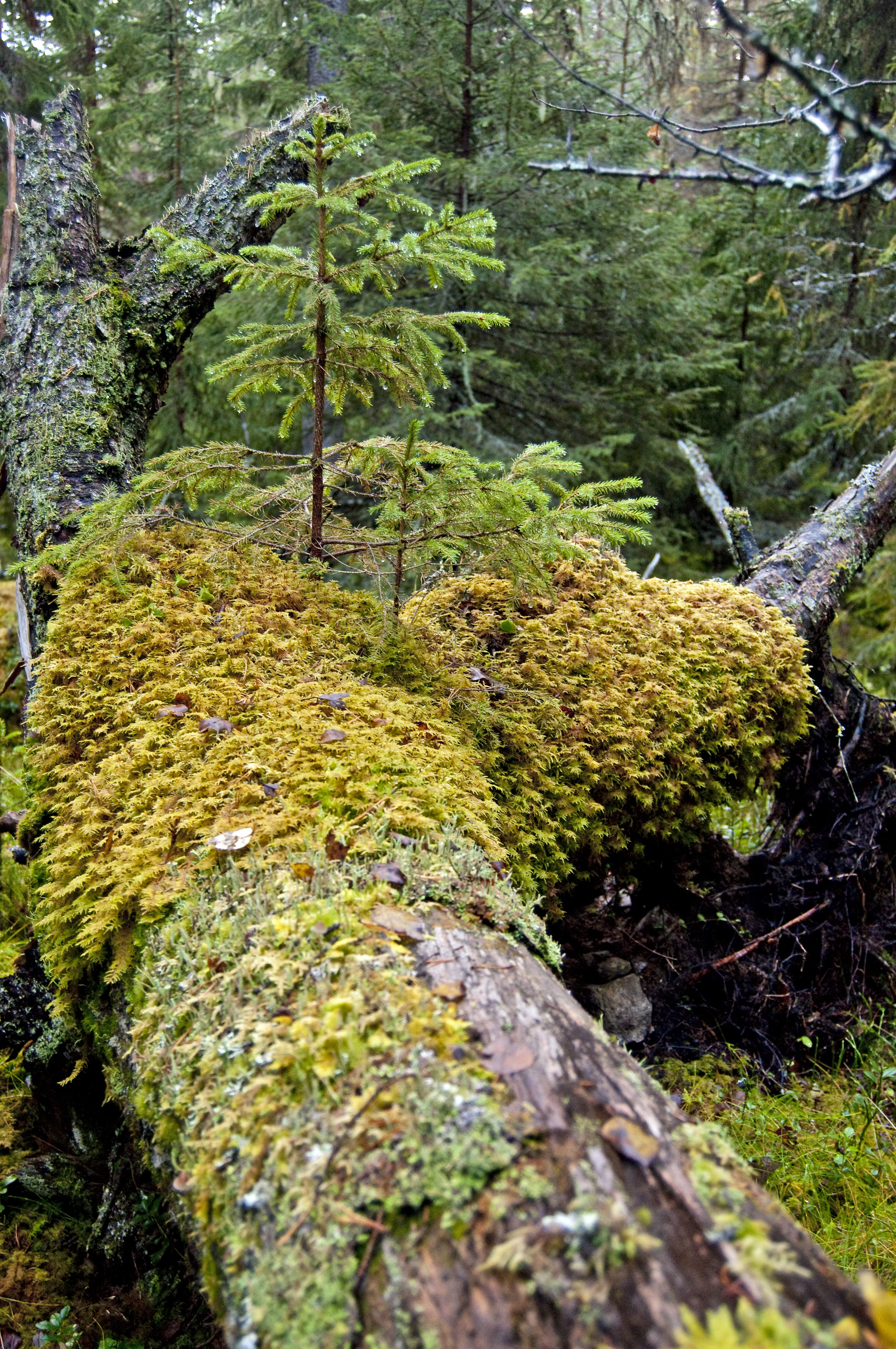
Fallen logs are critical components of the nutrient cycle in terrestrial forests. Nurse logs form habitats for other creatures that decompose the materials and recycle the nutrients back into production.

Nutrient cycling has a historical foothold in the writings of Charles Darwin, particularly in reference to the decomposition actions of earthworms. Darwin wrote about "the continued movement of the particles of earth". Even earlier, in 1749, Carl Linnaeus wrote: "the economy of nature we understand the all-wise disposition of the creator in relation to natural things, by which they are fitted to produce general ends, and reciprocal uses", in reference to the balance of nature in his book Oeconomia Naturae. In this book, he captured the notion of ecological recycling: "The 'reciprocal uses' are the key to the whole idea, for 'the death, and destruction of one thing should always be subservient to the restitution of another;' thus mould spurs the decay of dead plants to nourish the soil, and the earth then 'offers again to plants from its bosom, what it has received from them.'" The basic idea of a balance of nature, however, can be traced back to the Greeks: Democritus, Epicurus, and their Roman disciple Lucretius.

Following the Greeks, the idea of a hydrological cycle (water is considered a nutrient) was validated and quantified by Halley in 1687. Dumas and Boussingault (1844) provided a key paper that is recognized by some to be the true beginning of biogeochemistry, where they talked about the cycle of organic life in great detail. From 1836 to 1876, Jean Baptiste Boussingault demonstrated the nutritional necessity of minerals and nitrogen for plant growth and development. Prior to this time, influential chemists discounted the importance of mineral nutrients in soil. Ferdinand Cohn is another influential figure. "In 1872, Cohn described the 'cycle of life' as the "entire arrangement of nature" in which the dissolution of dead organic bodies provided the materials necessary for new life. The amount of material that could be molded into living beings was limited, he reasoned, so there must exist an "eternal circulation" (ewigem kreislauf) that constantly converts the same particle of matter from dead bodies into living bodies." These ideas were synthesized in the Master's research of Sergei Vinogradskii from 1881–1883.

=== Variations in terminology ===
In 1926, Vernadsky coined the term biogeochemistry as a sub-discipline of geochemistry. However, the term nutrient cycle predates biogeochemistry in a pamphlet on silviculture in 1899: "These demands by no means pass over the fact that at places where sufficient quantities of humus are available and where, in case of continuous decomposition of litter, a stable, nutrient humus is present, considerable quantities of nutrients are also available from the biogenic nutrient cycle for the standing timber. In 1898 there is a reference to the nitrogen cycle in relation to nitrogen fixing microorganisms. Other uses and variations on the terminology relating to the process of nutrient cycling appear throughout history:

- The term mineral cycle appears early in a 1935 in reference to the importance of minerals in plant physiology: "...ash is probably either built up into its permanent structure, or deposited in some way as waste in the cells, and so may not be free to re-enter the mineral cycle."
- The term nutrient recycling appears in a 1964 paper on the food ecology of the wood stork: "While the periodic drying up and reflooding of the marshes creates special survival problems for organisms in the community, the fluctuating water levels favor rapid nutrient recycling and subsequent high rates of primary and secondary production"
- The term natural cycling appears in a 1968 paper on the transportation of leaf litter and its chemical elements for consideration in fisheries management: "Fluvial transport of tree litter from drainage basins is a factor in natural cycling of chemical elements and in the degradation of the land."
- The term ecological recycling appears in a 1968 publication on future applications of ecology for the creation of different modules designed for living in extreme environments, such as space or under the sea: "For our basic requirement of recycling vital resources, the oceans provide much more frequent ecological recycling than the land area. Fish and other organic populations have higher growth rates, vegetation has less capricious weather problems for sea harvesting."
- The term bio-recycling appears in a 1976 paper on the recycling of organic carbon in oceans: "Following the actualistic assumption, then, that biological activity is responsible for the source of dissolved organic material in the oceans, but is not important for its activities after death of the organisms and subsequent chemical changes which prevent its bio-recycling, we can see no major difference in the behavior of dissolved organic matter between the prebiotic and postbiotic oceans."

Water is also a nutrient. In this context, some authors also refer to precipitation recycling, which "is the contribution of evaporation within a region to precipitation in that same region." These variations on the theme of nutrient cycling continue to be used and all refer to processes that are part of the global biogeochemical cycles. However, authors tend to refer to natural, organic, ecological, or bio-recycling in reference to the work of nature, such as it is used in organic farming or ecological agricultural systems.

== Recycling in novel ecosystems ==
An endless stream of technological waste accumulates in different spatial configurations across the planet and becomes hazardous in our soils, our streams, and our oceans. This idea was similarly expressed in 1954 by ecologist Paul Sears: "We do not know whether to cherish the forest as a source of essential raw materials and other benefits or to remove it for the space it occupies. We expect a river to serve as both vein and artery carrying away waste but bringing usable material in the same channel. Nature long ago discarded the nonsense of carrying poisonous wastes and nutrients in the same vessels." Ecologists use population ecology to model contaminants as competitors or predators. Rachel Carson was an ecological pioneer in this area as her book Silent Spring inspired research into biomagnification and brought to the world's attention the unseen pollutants moving into the food chains of the planet.

In contrast to the planet's natural ecosystems, technology (or technoecosystems) is not reducing its impact on planetary resources. Only 7% of total plastic waste (adding up to millions upon millions of tons) is being recycled by industrial systems; the 93% that never makes it into the industrial recycling stream is presumably absorbed by natural recycling systems In contrast and over extensive lengths of time (billions of years) ecosystems have maintained a consistent balance with production roughly equaling respiratory consumption rates. The balanced recycling efficiency of nature means that production of decaying waste material has exceeded rates of recyclable consumption into food chains equal to the global stocks of fossilized fuels that escaped the chain of decomposition.

Pesticides soon spread through everything in the ecosphere-both human technosphere and nonhuman biosphere-returning from the 'out there' of natural environments back into plant, animal, and human bodies situated at the 'in here' of artificial environments with unintended, unanticipated, and unwanted effects. By using zoological, toxicological, epidemiological, and ecological insights, Carson generated a new sense of how 'the environment' might be seen.

Microplastics and nanosilver materials flowing and cycling through ecosystems from pollution and discarded technology are among a growing list of emerging ecological concerns. For example, unique assemblages of marine microbes have been found to digest plastic accumulating in the world's oceans. Discarded technology is absorbed into soils and creates a new class of soils called technosols. Human wastes in the Anthropocene are creating new systems of ecological recycling, novel ecosystems that have to contend with the mercury cycle and other synthetic materials that are streaming into the biodegradation chain. Microorganisms have a significant role in the removal of synthetic organic compounds from the environment empowered by recycling mechanisms that have complex biodegradation pathways. The effect of synthetic materials, such as nanoparticles and microplastics, on ecological recycling systems is listed as one of the major concerns for ecosystems in this century.

=== Technological recycling ===
Recycling in human industrial systems (or technoecosystems) differs from ecological recycling in scale, complexity, and organization. Industrial recycling systems do not focus on the employment of ecological food webs to recycle waste back into different kinds of marketable goods, but primarily employ people and technodiversity instead. Some researchers have questioned the premise behind these and other kinds of technological solutions under the banner of 'eco-efficiency' are limited in their capability, harmful to ecological processes, and dangerous in their hyped capabilities. Many technoecosystems are competitive and parasitic toward natural ecosystems. Food web or biologically based "recycling includes metabolic recycling (nutrient recovery, storage, etc.) and ecosystem recycling (leaching and in situ organic matter mineralization, either in the water column, in the sediment surface, or within the sediment)."

== See also ==
- Plastic pollution
