= Coupled human–environment system =

Concept in ecology

A coupled human–environment system (known also as a coupled human and natural system, or CHANS) characterizes the dynamical two-way interactions between human systems (e.g., economic, social, cultural) and natural (e.g., hydrologic, atmospheric, biological, geological) systems. This coupling expresses the idea that human and environmental systems may no longer be treated as individual isolated systems. The complexity that CHANS research reveals is useful to inform policy decisions regarding environmental sustainability.

CHANS research is a broad field. Some research programs draw from, and build on, the perspectives developed in interdisciplinary fields such as human ecology, ecological anthropology, environmental geography, economics, as well as others. In contrast, other research programs, such as Critical Zone science, aim to develop a more quantitative theoretic framework focusing on the development of analytical and numerical models, by building on theoretical advances in complex adaptive systems, complexity economics, dynamical systems theory, and the earth sciences. To some extent, all CHANS programs recognize the need to move beyond traditional research methods developed in the social and natural sciences, as these are not sufficient to quantify the highly nonlinear dynamics often present in CHANS. Some research into CHANS emulates the more traditional research programs that tended to separate the social from the ecological sciences.

== Research ==
CHANS research seeks to uncover the reciprocal processes and interactions that link human and natural elements of a system or between systems.

=== Framework Elements ===
CHANS research frameworks use central elements to reveal complex relationships and dynamics within and between systems.

- Flows: a flow is a transfer between elements within a focal system or from a system to another system. The transfer can include "information, energy, material, organisms, people, and/or capital" (Liu 2017).
- Agents: an agent is someone or thing, involved with the system, whose decisions affect the strength of interactions within the system or between systems.
- Causes: The causes are the circumstances that lead to the coupled dynamic either within a system or between systems.
- Effects: The effects are outcomes of the coupled interactions. Effects integrate socioeconomic with environmental repercussions and can be complex.
- Spillover: A spillover system is a separate system affected by the interactions within the focal system. Even though there is one focal system for the intracoupling framework, a spillover system might be present.
- Sending system: a sending system is a system that sends a flow to another system, either adjacent or distant.
- Receiving system: a receiving system is a system that receives a flow to another system, either adjacent or distant.

It's important to note that a system can be both sending and receiving in different contexts for different research questions.

=== Conceptual Framework ===
In order to connect location specific CHANS research and accumulate knowledge on coupled systems, multiple research frameworks were created with different scales and complexities in mind.

1. Intracoupling is for research within one coupled system
2. Pericoupling is used to analyze two coupled systems that are geographically adjacent from each other.
3. Telecoupling provides guidance for research on two systems that are spatially distant from each other.
4. Metacoupling uses all three previous frameworks (intracoupling, pericoupling, and telecoupling) at the same time.

=== Common Patterns ===
When social science and natural science research is integrated within CHANS research, some common and distinct patterns emerge that would otherwise be hidden.

- Reciprocal Effects: These effects provide a similar benefit to both subsystems (both natural and human).
- Feedback Loops: A feedback loop emerges when one subsystem (either natural or human) effects and is also affected by the other subsystem. An impact flow is going in and out of both subsystems.
- Nonlinearity: There can be a nonlinear relationship between two variables within a coupled system. This describes a dynamic whose rate of change does not consistently match the rate of change of the variables.
  - A concept that supports nonlinearity is a threshold. This describes a point of shifting between different states of being. This shift can happen through time or space.
- Surprises: This pattern describes a literal surprise to researchers. This occurs when something unintended emerges.
- Legacy Effects: A legacy effect is an impact from a previously coupled system that becomes apparent or influential after some time. Time lags are an important factor here as they describe the time it takes for a coupling to produce an impact.
- Resilience: Resilience is the ability of a system to continue after a disruption. CHANS research can reveal the different resilience degrees that different systems have.
- Heterogeneity: This pattern describes the way that different systems vary in their composition and behavior. Even the same system can operate differently in a different time period or space.

=== Research Examples ===
CHANS research is broad and the frameworks can be applied to many different contexts and research questions. Below are a few examples to demonstrate some uses of the CHANS concepts.

One popular and foundational CHANS study focused on revealing the interactions between panda habitats, local people, and government policy in Wolong Nature Reserve in China. The reserve is a significant panda habitat and holds about 4,500 residents who rely on the natural environment for daily activities. As the population grew, the panda habitat suffered. To prevent further damage the government implemented some policies that incentivized residents to protect and restore the natural environment. These programs include subsidies given to those who track and protect forests from illegal harvesting and those who convert their farmland into forest. Because of this action from the government and action from locals who directly transform the environment, the panda habitat is in a better state. These interactions and dynamics were discovered using multiple models over multiple studies which demonstrate complex CHANS patterns like feedbacks and time lags.

Sarkar, Debnath, and Reang (2021) used a coupled human and environmental systems framework to understand the complex dynamic between the socioeconomic and environmental impacts from government responses to the Covid-19 Pandemic. Due to the scale of the pandemic, the entire world system was affected. The authors argued that understanding the shifts within the larger system would help inform policy decisions in local and regionally specific systems. Conducting a literature review, the researchers analyzed the effects of lockdown and government imposed restrictions on the following: economic recession, poverty, transportation, waste generation, social activities, workplaces, environmental noise, biodiversity, and education. They created a model to demonstrate how these factors were influenced in a positive or negative way including flow directions and feedback loops. This model provides a starting point for further studies of CHANS during similarly critical and complex events and direction for future policy.

Paudel et al. (2025) conducted a CHANS study to understand the nexus between farmland abandonment, migration and wildlife encroachment in three mountain regions in Karnali River Basin, Nepal. Agriculture in Nepal's highlands regions provide multiple measures of environmental health, an income and livelihood for residents, and resources (food) for the county. Despite this, farmland abandonment is increasing. The purpose of this paper is to investigate the influence of migration and wildlife encroachment on farmland abandonment to inform Nepalese policy and provide a reference point for other areas experiencing similar issues. Questionnaire data was taken from 169 households and combined with known geographic farmland abandonment data. It was concluded that migration and wildlife encroachment are significant triggering factors that lead to farmland abandonment. Other factors that contribute are ones known to make agriculture difficult such as access to resources including water and labor.

== History ==
The phrase "coupled human–environment systems" appears in the early literature from 1999, specifying that social and natural systems are inseparable. The idea that the population and the environment are interdependent goes back further. Conceptually, CHANS theory builds on other theories which connect human and natural aspects through interactions specifically, social-ecological system (SES) theory. CHANS offers a broader framework than other related theories as it can encompass all aspects of human life (beyond just social aspects) and all aspects of natural life (not just environmental).

Funding by the United States National Science Foundation (NSF) to study "Dynamics of Coupled Natural and Human Systems" occurred from 2001-2005 as a part of a "special competition" within the "Biocomplexity in the environment" program. In 2007, the NSF created a "formal standing program in Dynamics of Coupled Natural and Human Systems". Research into CHANS is increasing in frequency in scientific literature concerning the sustainability and conservation of ecosystems and society. In 2009, the Dynamics of Coupled Natural and Human Systems program supported the foundation of the International Network of Research on Coupled Human and Natural Systems (CHANS-Net) which provides a central place for CHANS researchers to collaborate.

== Future of CHANS Research ==
CHANS research runs the risk of under-developing the two way link and influence within or between elements of systems due to the high number of potential variables. There is a trend between research teams which have members from social sciences and successfully developing a two way flow. Moving forward, it is integral for CHANS research teams and individual members to be interdisciplinary to increase the likelihood that CHANS research can work towards its purpose: to deepen understanding of connected systems.

CHANS researchers consider questions regarding the following to be the most pressing for future research: land use and agriculture, conservation and ecosystem services, scale, climate change, sustainability and development, adaptation and resilience, society and culture, education and science communication, governance, economics, and general principles and system dynamics. There is some overlap between these valuations and similar perceived primary questions in other fields like marine conservation and agriculture science. With how broad this research field is, these most importantly valued questions can act as a useful guide for future research and policy.

== Bibliography ==
- W.C. Clark, B. L. Turner, R. W. Kates, J. Richards, J. T. Mathews, and W. Meyer, eds. The Earth as Transformed by Human Action. (Cambridge, UK: Cambridge University Press, 1990).
- Turner, B. L; Matson, Pamela A; McCarthy, James J; Corell, Robert W; Christensen, Lindsey; Eckley, Noelle; Hovelsrud-Broda, Grete K; Kasperson, Jeanne X; Kasperson, Roger E; Luers, Amy; Martello, Marybeth L; Mathiesen, Svein; Naylor, Rosamond; Polsky, Colin; Pulsipher, Alexander; Schiller, Andrew; Selin, Henrik; Tyler, Nicholas (2003). "Illustrating the coupled human–environment system for vulnerability analysis: Three case studies". Proceedings of the National Academy of Sciences. 100 (14): 8080–5. Bibcode:2003PNAS..100.8080T. doi:10.1073/pnas.1231334100. JSTOR 3139883. PMC 166185. PMID 12815106.
- Eric Sheppard and Robert B. McMaster, eds. Scale and Geographic Inquiry: Nature, Society, and Method (see especially "Crossing the Divide: Linking Global and Local Scales in Human–Environment Systems" by William E. Easterling and Colin Polsky) (Blackwell Publishing, January 1, 2004)

== See also ==
- Human ecology
- Conservation medicine
- Deep ecology
- Environmental factor – examples of coupled systems
