= Integrated geography =

Intersection of human and physical geography

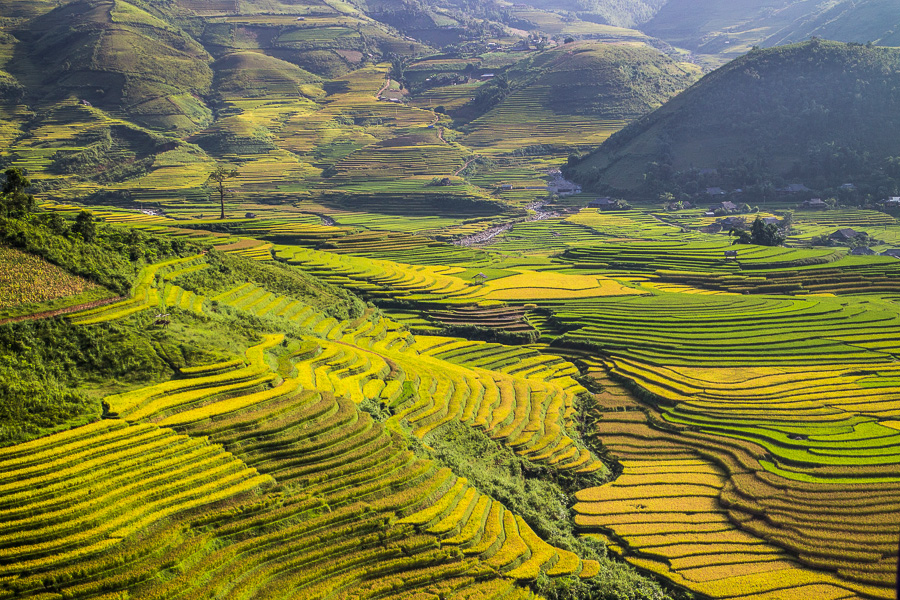
Rice terraces located in Mù Cang Chải district, Yên Bái province, Vietnam

Integrated geography (also referred to as integrative geography, environmental geography or human–environment geography) is where the branches of human geography and physical geography overlap to describe and explain the spatial aspects of interactions between human individuals or societies and their natural environment, these interactions being called coupled human–environment system.

== Origins ==
Integrated geography requires an understanding of the dynamics of physical geography and how human societies conceptualize the environment (human geography). Thus, to a certain degree, it may be seen as a successor of Physische Anthropogeographie (English: "physical anthropogeography")—a term coined by University of Vienna geographer Albrecht Penck in 1924—and geographical cultural or human ecology (Harlan H. Barrows 1923).

Integrated geography in the United States is principally influenced by the schools of Carl O. Sauer (Berkeley), whose perspective was rather historical, and Gilbert F. White (Chicago), who developed a more applied view. Integrated geography describes and explains the spatial aspects of interactions between individuals or societies and their natural environment, known as coupled human–environment systems.

== Focus ==
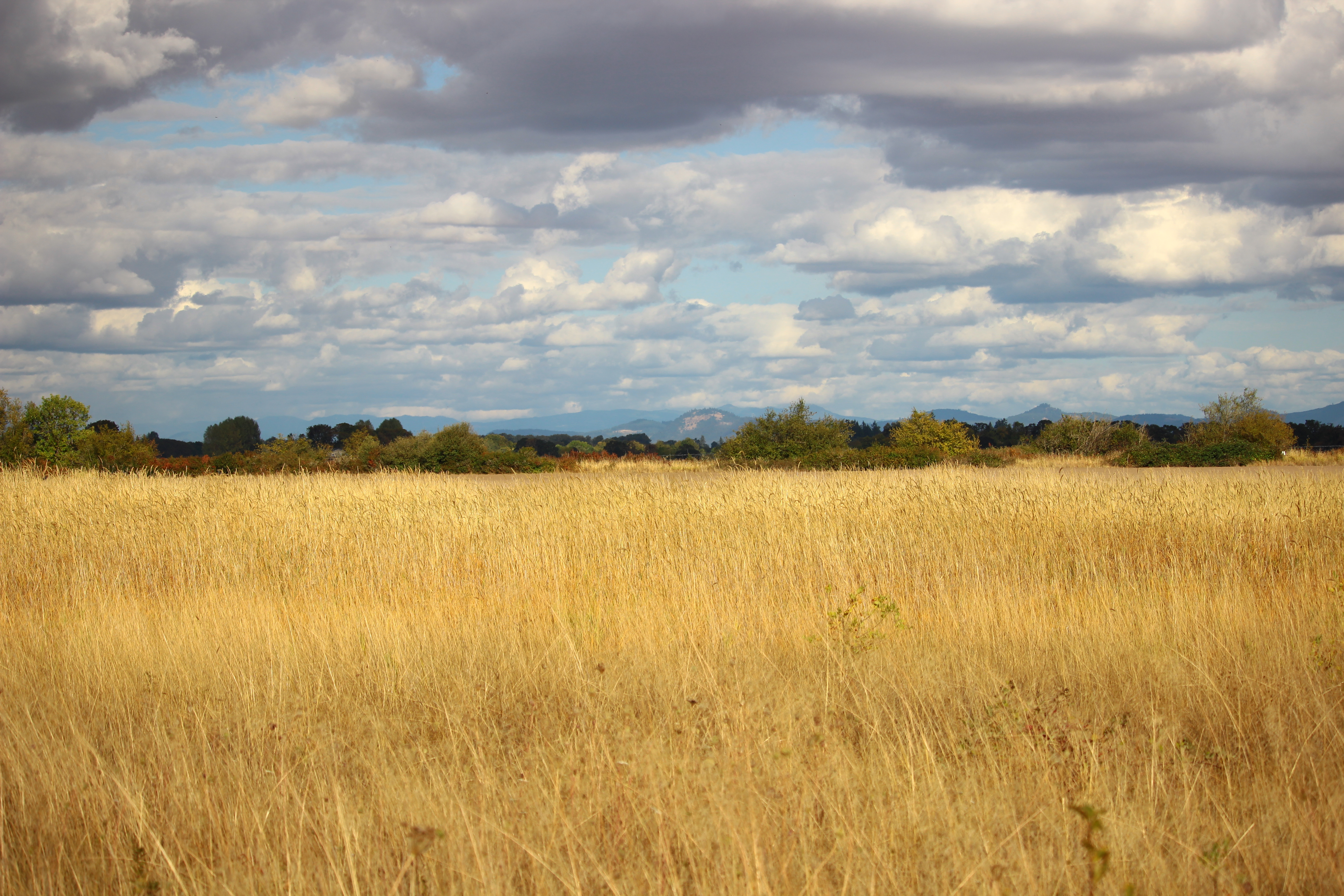
Wildlife refuge located in Oregon, United States.

The links between human and physical geography were once more apparent than they are today. As human experience of the world is increasingly mediated by technology, the relationships between humans and the environment have often become obscured. Thereby, integrated geography represents a critically important set of analytical tools for assessing the impact of human presence on the environment. This is done by measuring the result of human activity on natural landforms and cycles. Methods for which this information is gained include remote sensing, and geographic information systems.

Integrated geography helps us to ponder the environment in terms of its relationship to people. With integrated geography, we can analyze different social science and humanities perspectives and their use in understanding people's environmental processes. Hence, it is considered the third branch of geography, the other branches being physical and human geography.
