= Bonnie McCay =

American anthropologist (born 1941)

Bonnie J. McCay (born 6 October 1941) is an anthropologist and Board of Governors Distinguished Service Professor Emerita at Rutgers University. Her research has focused on the anthropological and social aspects of common property theory, with particular emphasis on fisheries management and human–environment relations in marine areas. Her critique of the concept of tragedy of the commons predates the more well-known work by Elinor Ostrom.

McCay studied at Valparaiso University from 1959 to 1960 and at the University of California, Berkeley from 1960 to 1962 before completing a B.A. in anthropology at Portland State University in 1969. She then went to Columbia University for her graduate studies, completing her Ph.D. in 1976 under the supervision of Andrew P. Vayda, who in the meantime had moved from Columbia to Rutgers. She joined Vayda on the Rutgers faculty in 1974, first as an instructor at Cook College, and then beginning in 1975 as a tenure-track faculty member.

She became a fellow of the American Association for the Advancement of Science in 1990 and of the Society for Applied Anthropology in 1996. In 2012 she was elected to the United States National Academy of Sciences.
