= Andrew P. Vayda =

American anthropologist (1931–2022)

- Born: December 7, 1931; Budapest, Hungary
- Died: January 15, 2022 (aged 90)
- Education: Columbia University (BA, PhD)
- Scientific career
- Fields: Anthropology; Ecology
- Workplaces: Rutgers University; Columbia University; University of British Columbia; University of Indonesia

Andrew P. "Pete" Vayda (December 7, 1931 – January 15, 2022) was a Hungarian-born American anthropologist and ecologist who was a distinguished professor emeritus of anthropology and ecology at Rutgers University.

== Biographical background ==
Vayda was born in Budapest, Hungary, on December 7, 1931. He came to the United States in 1939 with his mother. He grew up in New York City. He attended Columbia University, obtaining his B.A. in 1952 and his Ph.D. in anthropology in 1956. His dissertation, based on library research he had done in New Zealand in 1954–1955, was a detailed description and analysis of Maori warfare.

A distinguished professor of anthropology and ecology at Rutgers University in New Brunswick, New Jersey, from 1972 until his retirement in 2002, he had also been a professor at Columbia University (1960–1972) and a lecturer at the University of British Columbia (1958–1960). Beginning in the 1960s and continuing into his retirement years, he taught also at various European, American, Australian, and Indonesian universities for periods of a year or less.

Social and ecological field research was conducted and/or directed by Vayda in the coral atolls of the Northern Cook Islands in 1956–57, in Papua New Guinea during the 1960s, and in Indonesia at various times and on various islands since the 1970s until 2017. He founded the journal Human Ecology in 1972 and served on the editorial boards of this and other journals through the years. From 2002, he was an independent scholar with a home base in New York City and also an adjunct professor at Monash University in Melbourne, Australia, and at the University of Indonesia in Depok, Indonesia, and a senior research associate of the Center for International Forestry Research (CIFOR) in Bogor, Indonesia. A festschrift in his honor was published in 2008. In December 2021, Human Ecology published a tribute to Vayda in celebration of his 90th birthday.

Vayda died on January 15, 2022, at the age of 90. A virtual obituary, with pictures from Vayda's various excursions and of him and his loved ones, was created in his honor.

== Contributions ==
Vayda's long and varied career featured historical, anthropological, ecological, philosophical, and interdisciplinary research. He is known also for his criticisms of the work of others for failures of causal reasoning and explanation and for undue generalizing and theorizing in the absence of adequate supporting evidence. His published works include some hundred articles and three books. He has also edited or co-edited four books.

Maori Warfare, the book based on Vayda's Ph.D. dissertation, was first published in 1960. Now a classic, it has been regarded as the authoritative work on the subject of Maori warfare in its last stage of evolution before being greatly altered by European weapons and ways. As such, it continues to guide archaeological research in New Zealand and has been important also for anthropological and ecological studies of war. In the 1960s, Vayda extended his studies of intergroup fighting to societies in Borneo and New Guinea. His New Guinea findings have special value as products of field research carried out among groups contacted and pacified by outsiders only a few years earlier. The findings figure prominently in an important 1989 article, “Explaining Why Marings Fought.” In this, Vayda admitted to certain errors of reification and fallacies of functional explanation in some of his own earlier work and he showed how avoidable ambiguities in the meaning of questions about why people fight have led to long, unproductive, and acrimonious debates among scholars. This last theme was taken up again in a 1992 review article on the anthropology of war. Both articles are included in Vayda's 2009 essay collection, Explaining Human Actions and Environmental Changes. The 1989 article is noteworthy also as an extended illustration of Vayda's abiding interest in analyzing and explaining explanation itself and in engaging with the philosophical literature on explanation.

Vayda's year (1956–57) in the coral atolls of the Northern Cook Islands failed to produce the ethnographic monograph expected at the time from extended anthropological fieldwork. However, it did result in a number of articles, including some on such unconventional topics as the relation of island size to sexual activity and to openness to cultural innovations. Throughout his career, Vayda's efforts have been directed mainly towards the production of critical, analytic articles on various topics rather than big books with overarching themes.

Having become involved in UNESCO's Man and Biosphere Program, Vayda directed or co-directed in the 1970s and 1980s a series of interdisciplinary projects on the causes of deforestation in the Indonesian province of East Kalimantan on the island of Borneo. The projects resulted in useful data on how, why, and to what extent did specific activities such as legal and illegal logging, pepper farming by migrants from another island, and shifting cultivation, contribute to deforestation. In addition, the projects are notable for certain conceptual and methodological innovations. Thus, breaking with the anthropological tradition of conducting holistic studies of communities or societies within which the activities of interest occurred, the projects concentrated on explaining the activities by relating them to the specific contexts in which they were occurring and by making the contexts themselves the objects of research to make them broader or denser in explanation-relevant ways. This is what Bonnie McCay has referred to as “progressive vs. a priori contextualization.” The methodology, as set forth in Vayda's article, “Progressive Contextualization; Methods for Research in Human Ecology,” has been adopted by many anthropologists, geographers, and others doing applied research, and the article has been and continues to be widely cited. Following the 1980s research related to deforestation, Vayda engaged in or directed other research in Indonesia in projects related to such subjects as integrated pest management, possibilities for relocation of settlers from a national park, and possibilities for control of forest and peat fires.

Vayda's critiques of views and approaches accepted by and popular among colleagues in the social sciences and human ecology are numerous and varied. They have been described as “creative destruction” resulting in influential intellectual innovation. Included in the approaches critiqued were some Vayda himself had previously been partial to. The criticisms have pertained, inter alia, to the following for being based on theories, assumptions, and/or methodologies whereby broad conclusions either poorly supported or actually contradicted by evidence are drawn and/or practical conclusions fail to be drawn:

- Earlier anthropologists’ emphasis on the social and/or ceremonial character of such institutions as potlatches in North America and pig feasts in Melanesia, with no recognition and not even consideration of their significance for subsistence.
- Julian Steward's cultural ecology and Charles Frake's ethno-ecology.
- The “calorific obsession” and equilibrium bias of some ecologists and ecological anthropologists.
- Roy Rappaport's metaphysical holism.
- Marvin Harris's cultural materialism.
- Marshall Sahlins's essentialist structuralism.
- The adaptationism of human behavioral ecologists (called “Darwinian Ecological Anthropologists” by Vayda).
- Cognitive anthropologists’ failure to deal with the knowledge bases of practical human activities or actions.
- Steve Lansing's selective use of evidence to support his modelling of Balinese agro-ecological change.
- The undue claims made for the holistic study of local knowledge systems as practical guides to economic development and environmental conservation.
- Such whole fields as political ecology and spiritual ecology, criticized for their promotion of confirmation bias by virtue of their causes-to-effects rather than effects-to-causes research methodology (see below).

The methodological approach favored by Vayda and his frequent collaborator, Bradley Walters, drew on pragmatic features of the work of such philosophers as David Lewis on causal explanation and Charles S. Peirce on abductive reasoning. The approach had the following key features (or “admonitions” as the geographer/political ecologist Paul Robbins has called some of them):

- Events, including human actions, were made the usual objects of explanation. Among examples from Vayda's work were the events comprising deforestation, intergroup fighting, migration, forest fires, and adoption or non-adoption of integrated pest management.
- Explanation and explanation-oriented research proceed from the events that are regarded as the effects to be explained (i.e., the explananda) to their causes and not vice versa, thus reducing the confirmation bias which, according to Vayda and Walters, was promoted by the causes-to-effects research characteristic of such fields as political ecology.
- Multiple and/or alternative causal possibilities were investigated, with some usually being eliminated while others, comprising some portion of the causal histories of the explanandum events, were left to stand as likely or possible explanations.
- The main goal of research and explanation was seen as simply answering why-questions about concrete changes or events of interest and not as the kind of development or evaluation of general theories or models favored by many scholars, although theories or models were sometimes used as sources of the causal possibilities considered.

In his last decades Vayda used this methodological approach in explanation-oriented research on forest and peat fires in Indonesia.

== Publications ==
Vayda published some hundred articles and several books, including Explaining Human Actions and Environmental Changes, a selection of his essays on explanation and explanation-oriented research in the social sciences and human ecology, published by AltaMira Press in 2009, and Causal Explanation for Social Scientists: A Reader, co-edited by him and Bradley B. Walters, published by AltaMira Press in 2011. A festschrift in his honor, Against the Grain: The Vayda Tradition in Human Ecology and Ecological Anthropology, with a concluding chapter by him on “Causal Explanation as a Research Goal,” was published in 2008 by AltaMira Press.

Books by Vayda
- Explaining Human Actions and Environmental Changes, Lanham, MD: AltaMira Press. 2009 ISBN 978-0-7591-0323-8
- War in Ecological Perspective, New York: Plenum Press. 1976.
- Maori Warfare, Wellington, NZ: Polynesian Society, 1960, reprinted 1970.

Books Edited
- Causal Explanation for Social Scientists: A Reader (co-edited with Bradley B. Walters), Lanham, MD: AltaMira Press. 2011 ISBN 978-0-7591-1325-1
- Environment and Cultural Behavior, Garden City, NY: The Natural History Press. 1969
- Peoples and Cultures of the Pacific, Garden City, NY: The Natural History Press. 1968
- Man, Culture, and Animals: The Role of Animals in Human Ecological Adjustments (co-edited with Anthony Leeds), Washington, D.C.: American Association for the Advancement of Science, 1965.

== Past Graduate and PhD students ==
- Cristina Eghenter, Social Development Deputy Director, World Wide Fund for Nature Indonesia.
- Kevin Flesher, Research Director, Centro de Estudos de Biodiversidade, Michelin Ecological Reserve, Ituberá, Brazil.
- Timothy C. Jessup, Indonesia Green Growth Specialist, Global Green Growth Institute.
- Jay F. Kelly, Associate Professor of Biology and Environmental Science, Raritan Valley Community College.
- Bonnie J. McCay, Board of Governors Distinguished Service Professor-Emerita, Rutgers University.
- Christine Padoch, Senior Curator Emerita of the Institute of Economic Botany, New York Botanical Garden.
- Roy Rappaport (deceased), Professor of Anthropology, University of Michigan.
- Iwan Tjitradjaja (deceased), Head, Department of Anthropology, University of Indonesia.
- Patricia J. Vondal, International Development Consultant.
- Bradley B. Walters, Professor of Geography & Environment at Mount Allison University, Canada

== See also ==
- Progressive contextualization

== Other Sources ==
- Walters, B.B., 2013. “Vayda, Andrew P.” In: McGee, R.J., and Warms, R.L., eds., Theory in Social and Cultural Anthropology: An Encyclopedia, Thousand Oaks, CA: Sage Publications, pp. 889–891.
- McCay, B.J., 2008. “An intellectual history of ecological anthropology.” In: Walters, B.B., McCay, B.J., West, P., and Lees, S., eds., Against the Grain: The Vayda Tradition in Human Ecology and Ecological Anthropology, Lanham, MD: AltaMira Press, pp. 11–26.
- Vayda, A.P., 1994. “Intellectual roots.” In: Borofsky, R., ed., Assessing Cultural Anthropology, New York: McGraw-Hill. 1994, pp. 339–340.
- A 53-minute video interview of Vayda on his life and work as of April 2008. The interview took place on April 5, 2008, in Sackville, New Brunswick, Canada, and was conducted by Dr. Patricia Kelly Spurles of Mount Allison University. Uploaded to YouTube by Professor Alan Macfarlane of King's College, Cambridge University, the video is included in a series of interviews with scholars.
- Walters, B. B., Doolittle, W. E., Klooster, D., Rocheleau, D., Turner, B. L., II, and Vayda, A. P., 2011. “Book review forum: Explaining human actions and environmental changes” [Five reviews of Vayda's 2009 book, followed by his reply]. Dialogues in Human Geography 1:370–389.
- ResearchGate's almost complete list of Vayda's publications, many of them available for free download (www.researchgate.net). (There is a much less complete list at Academia.edu.)
