= Novel ecosystem =

Human-created ecological niche

Novel or emergent ecosystems emerge when human activities, land use, and anthropogenic climate change push ecological assemblages to morph outside of historical configurations, creating systems with no precedent in the ecological record. Novel ecosystems exist in urban, suburban, rural, and even wilderness areas that have been altered in structure and function by human agency, but a self-sustaining ecosystem is allowed to establish itself in the absence of ongoing human management. Novel vegetation associations growing along abandoned stone walls that once marked agricultural field boundaries and contaminated, esthetically unpleasant urban rivers undergoing ecologically-damaging "clean up" projects are examples of sites where research into novel ecosystem ecology is developing.

== Definition ==
Human society has transformed the planet to such an extent that, despite not being accepted as an official epoch on the geologic time scale, the Anthropocene has emerged as a useful term to describe the period of time over which humans have become a planetary force of change. While the term can also be used to describe naturally-occurring ecosystems characterized by new compositions or abundances of species that differ from historic and geologic baselines, the majority of scholars use the term to describe ecosystems with biotic and abiotic elements that are fundamentally and persistently changed by anthropogenic stressors.

=== Origin and development of the term ===
The term "novel ecosystem" was first used in 2006 to describe 1.) recent or future anthropogenic changes characterized by new species combinations that have the potential to change ecosystem function and 2.) ecosystems resulting from either deliberate or inadvertent human actions that do not require maintenance to persist. These novel ecosystems result from biotic response to human-induced abiotic conditions and/or new biotic elements, including land degradation, soil enrichment, invasive species introduction, or the abandonment of human-created systems, such as unused agricultural or pastoral land.

Clearly defining novel ecosystems is a much more difficult task than defining naturally-occurring ecosystems, given both the complexity of all of the human and ecological factors at play and the fact that their existence is inherently defined by disruption and change. Novelty is also defined by different parameters based on the scientific field in question. Climate scientists define novelty by departure from the long-term norm for temperatures or precipitation, while paleoecologists define novelty as any ecosystem shift observable in the geologic record. The term novelty is often employed without a clear working definition or may be used interchangeably with other words as a shorthand for change.

The most commonly cited defining features of novel ecosystems are:

1. That the ecosystem components (abiotic, biotic, and social) have been altered beyond a certain threshold, which is subjectively defined by location, not broadly.
2. The alteration was caused by human actions, whether direct or indirect.
3. The ecosystem is self-sustaining or continues to develop novel properties after the anthropogenic disruption occurred.

One analysis of novel ecosystem spread indicated that, unless rapid climate change mitigation tactics were taken, the coverage of novel ecosystems could include more than 50% of Earth's land surface by the year 2100, and 80% by the year 2300. However, another analysis argued against a "rough-and-ready discrete definition," as different areas exist on a continuum of novelty; defining novel ecosystems by human influence, which is omnipresent through land use, land management policies, and climate change, could result in a threshold so strict that no systems on earth could currently be considered 0% novel. Yet another analysis developed a quantifiable framework to define novel ecosystems in opposition to historical baselines (pre-human, early human, pre-industrial, recent-historical, and modern), developing applications and trajectories for each. Regardless of the discourse around a clearly-delineated definition, many researches agree that the emphasis should be placed on the trajectories of ongoing change, rather than on identifying the specific past moment of change.

=== Examples of novel ecoystems ===
One poignant example of a novel ecosystem is the Orfordness lighthouse, which was decommissioned in 2013 due to erosion and sea encroachment causing instability and dismantled in 2020. The lighthouse was built on Orford Ness, a shingle spit on the Suffolk coast of Great Britain. It makes up part of a designated National Nature Reserve due to it containing 20% of the European biomass of vegetated shingle habitat, which is extremely fragile and scarce. Orford Ness has a long history of human-landscape interaction, with local people building tidal walls and using the salt marsh for grazing as early as the 12th century. During the first and second World Wars, it was used as a top-secret military test site, including for use in the development of radar, and it continued its history of experimentation in the mid-20th century with environmental atomic bomb tests, and the fragile ecosystem is littered with unexploded explosives.

Other examples of agreed-upon novel ecosystems include:

- Urban woodlands subject to weed control exhibit less diverse sub-canopy communities, which leads to a decline in bird populations
- Grasslands dominated by non-native plants and with altered fire regimes
- Algal dominated coral reefs caused by pollution, ocean acidification, and climate warming
- Areas where tropical forests have been replaced by agriculture with no erosion control, causing artificial wetlands
- River deltas inundated by sea level rise
- A decommissioned quarry that has been colonized by ruderal species
- An artificial island created by ships unloading their ballast
- Non-native mussels invading bodies of water, reducing the biomass of primary producers and clogging dams
- Non-native, sometimes invasive plants serving as an important habitat site for endangered or threatened species suffering from habitat loss

== Novel ecosystem research and management ==
Novel ecosystems that differ in composition and function from historical systems are the hallmark of the Anthropocene, with no natural analogs due to human alterations on global climate systems, invasive species, an ongoing global mass extinction, invasive species spread due to globalization, and disruption of the global nitrogen cycle. Research on these novel ecosystems has lagged behind the pace at which new novel ecosystems are appearing due to human impacts, causing new dilemmas to emerge for terrestrial and marine conservation biologists.

=== Causes of novel ecosystem emergence ===
Three main factors are bear primary responsibility for the formation of novel ecosystems:

1. Human actions and impact resulting in localized extinction of most of the original flora, faun, and microbial populations and/or the introduction of one or multiple species that were not previously present in that biogeographical region.
2. Predominant urban, cultivated, or degraded landscapes surrounding the novel ecosystem that create dispersal barriers for flora, fauna, and microbial populations.
3. Direct human impact (such as removal of natural soil layers, dam construction, harvesting, or pollution) and indirect human impact (such as erosion due to vegetation loss or overgrazing, anthropogenic climatic shifts) has resulted in either major changes in the abiotic environment or a decrease in the initial species pool, both of which can prevent or hinder re-establishing pre-existing or native species.

=== Management strategies ===
Novel ecosystems are a young field of study because of their inherent nature, which is defined by change and newness. This, along with inadequate funding, resources, information, has led to tolerance and inaction as the default approach to managing these complex environments.

Tolerance can be a valid management strategy in cases where:

1. Non-native species invasion is not expected to result in significant deviation from ecosystem operation due to its similar function to the species native to the ecosystem
2. Non-native species in the ecosystem is not expect to reach levels necessary for displacement of native species and/or is forecasted to have a negligible impact
3. Non-native species in the ecosystem has a damaging impact, however, resources, information, or technology are not available to manage the effects, or the effects of attempted removal

Management strategies characterized by action, rather than inaction, are divided into two approaches: managing against novel ecosystems, and managing for novel ecosystems. The managing against strategy contains traditional restoration ecology approaches, where efforts are focused on returning degraded habitats and biomes to historical reference benchmarks through eradication of non-native species and re-colonization of native species. However, accelerating climate change often renders those baselines unattainable, and the novel ecosystems so thoroughly integrated that it leads to a state of practical unrestorability. Additionally, the removal of invasive species can open the way for secondary invaders, which detracts from overall ecosystem restoration success cases.

In response to novel ecosystems where tolerance and management against approaches fail, flexible approaches are increasingly adopted that integrate ecology, engineering, and social values to establish a new baseline based on contemporary reference points and interdisciplinary management strategies. Pristine restoration is often impossible, so ecosystem scientists have moved toward a goal of managing for and fostering resilient and adaptive ecosystems. The managing for approach is less common and comes with more controversy, but in the most extreme cases of species invasion or environmental degradation, it is often the only alternative.

Engineering principles have also been increasingly applied to ecological restoration projects by designing to mimic the activity of habitat-forming organisms and thus create positive feedback loops. For example, clustering transplanted cordgrass in a salt marsh can trigger sediment retention and hydraulic dampening, doubling overall success in transplant survival, post-transplant expansion, and shoot density.

=== Ecocentric approach to novel ecosystems ===
The total human ecosystem (THE) is an ecocentric concept that frames Anthropocene ecology through an integrated and interdisciplinary framework. The anthroposphere is a term, first used in the 1940s, that refers to the part of the Earth system that is inhabited and influenced by humans; this led to the term anthrome emerging in the early 2000s, which describes the terrestrial biosphere in its modern, human-altered form. Anthromes are delineated using the framework of biome definition to separate global patterns of sustained and direct human land use. Each anthrome is composed of a heterogenous mosaic of land uses and land cover, usually including areas that are partially reclaimed by nature.

Anthromes are sorted into the following groups using the Global Ecosystem Typology conventions:

- Intensive land-use biome: 1.) annual croplands, 2.) sown livestock pastures, 3.) plantations, 4.) urban and industrial ecosystems (dense settlement areas), and 5.) derived semi-natural pastures and old fields.
- Artificial wetlands biome: 1.) large reservoirs, 2.) constructed lacustrine wetlands, 3.) rice paddies, 4.) freshwater aquafarms, 5.) canals, ditches, and drains
- Anthropogenic marine biome: 1.) submerged artificial structures (shipwrecks and oil rigs), 2.) marine aquafarms
- Anthropogenic subterranean voids: 1.) anthropogenic subterranean voids (industrial excavations)
- Anthropogenic shorelines biome: 1.) artificial shorelines
- Anthropogenic subterranean freshwater biome: 1.) water pipes and subterranean canals, 2.) flooded mines and other voids

These anthromes are the sites at which human activity exerts the technosphere, or the part of the environment consisting of non-living human creations such as buildings, road, power plants, electricity grids, and heavy machinery, onto the ecosystems they inhabit. An example of the technosphere being inextricable from the natural biome is the presence of technosols, which are a new form of ground group in the World Reference Base for Soil Resources (WRB). Technosols are characterized by either a large amount of anthropogenic parent material or material moved or extracted by anthropogenic means, but do not include transported natural soil material. Similarly, anthrosols are a type of soil found in the WRB that is characterized by heavy modification or formation due to long-term human activity, such as farming. The areas that novel ecosystems are found in are at the intersection of the technosphere and the natural world, according to the ecocentrist framework.
