= Human Ecology (journal) =

- Discipline: Human ecology
- Language: English
- Edited by: Daniel Bates

Publication details
- History: 1972–present
- Publisher: Springer Science + Business Media
- Frequency: Quarterly
- Impact factor: 2.728 (2021)

Standard abbreviations
- ISO 4: Hum. Ecol.

Indexing
- CODEN: HMECAJ
- ISSN: 0300-7839 (print); 1572-9915 (web)
- LCCN: 72623826
- JSTOR: 03007839
- OCLC no.: 01057949

Links
- Journal homepage; Online access

Human Ecology: An Interdisciplinary Journal is a quarterly peer-reviewed academic journal covering research on human ecology. It was established in 1972 by Andrew P. Vayda. The co-Editors-in-chief are Sean S. Downey and Ludomir Lozny.

== Abstracting and indexing ==
The journal is abstracted and indexed in:

- Social Sciences Citation Index
- Scopus
- EBSCO databases
- ProQuest
- CAB International
- Abstracts in Anthropology
- Academic OneFile
- Anthropolocial Index Online
- Biological Abstracts
- BIOSIS
- CAB Abstracts
- Current Contents/Social & Behavioral Sciences
- EMBiology
- Expanded Academic
- GEOBASE
- INIS Atomindex

According to the Journal Citation Reports, the journal has a 2021 impact factor of 2.728.
