= Programmable controller =

Programmable controller may refer to:

- Microcontroller
- Programmable logic controller
- Programmable automation controller
- Programmable interrupt controller
  - Advanced Programmable Interrupt Controller
- Universal remote control
