= Progressive contextualization =

Forest protection scientific method

Progressive contextualization (PC) is a scientific method pioneered and developed by Andrew P. Vayda and research team between 1979 and 1984. The method was developed to help understand cause of damage and destruction of forest and land during the New Order Regime in Indonesia, as well as practical ethnography. Vayda proposed the Progressive contextualization method due to his dissatisfaction with several conventional anthropological methods to describe accurately and quickly cases of illegal logging, land destruction and the network of actor-investor protecting the actions, as well as various consequences detrimental to the environment and social life.

The essence of this method is to track and assess:

1. what the actor (actor-based) or network of certain actors (actor-based network) does in a certain location and time
2. the series of consequences (intended or unintended) that result from what the actors and/or networks do, in a time and space that can be different from the original time and space, as long as it is in accordance with the interest of the research and the available time. Therefore, the PC method does not have to be bound to a certain research place and time pre-determined in the research design.

It rejects the assumption of ecological and socio-cultural homogeneity. Instead, it focuses on diversity and it looks at how different individuals and groups operate in and adapt to their total environments through a variety of behaviors, technologies, organizations, structures and beliefs.

Due attention to context in the elucidation of actions and consequences may often mean having to deal with precisely the kind of factors and processes often scanted or denied by holistic approaches: the loose, transient, and contingent interactions, the disarticulating processes, and the movements of people, resources, and ideas across whatever boundaries that ecosystems, societies, and cultures are thought to have — Vayda, 1986

Based on such a premise and through the practical interpretation of facts, the approach will lead to 'concrete findings on who is doing what, why they are doing it, and with what effects.'
