= Technosphere =

Earth system sphere of non-living human creations

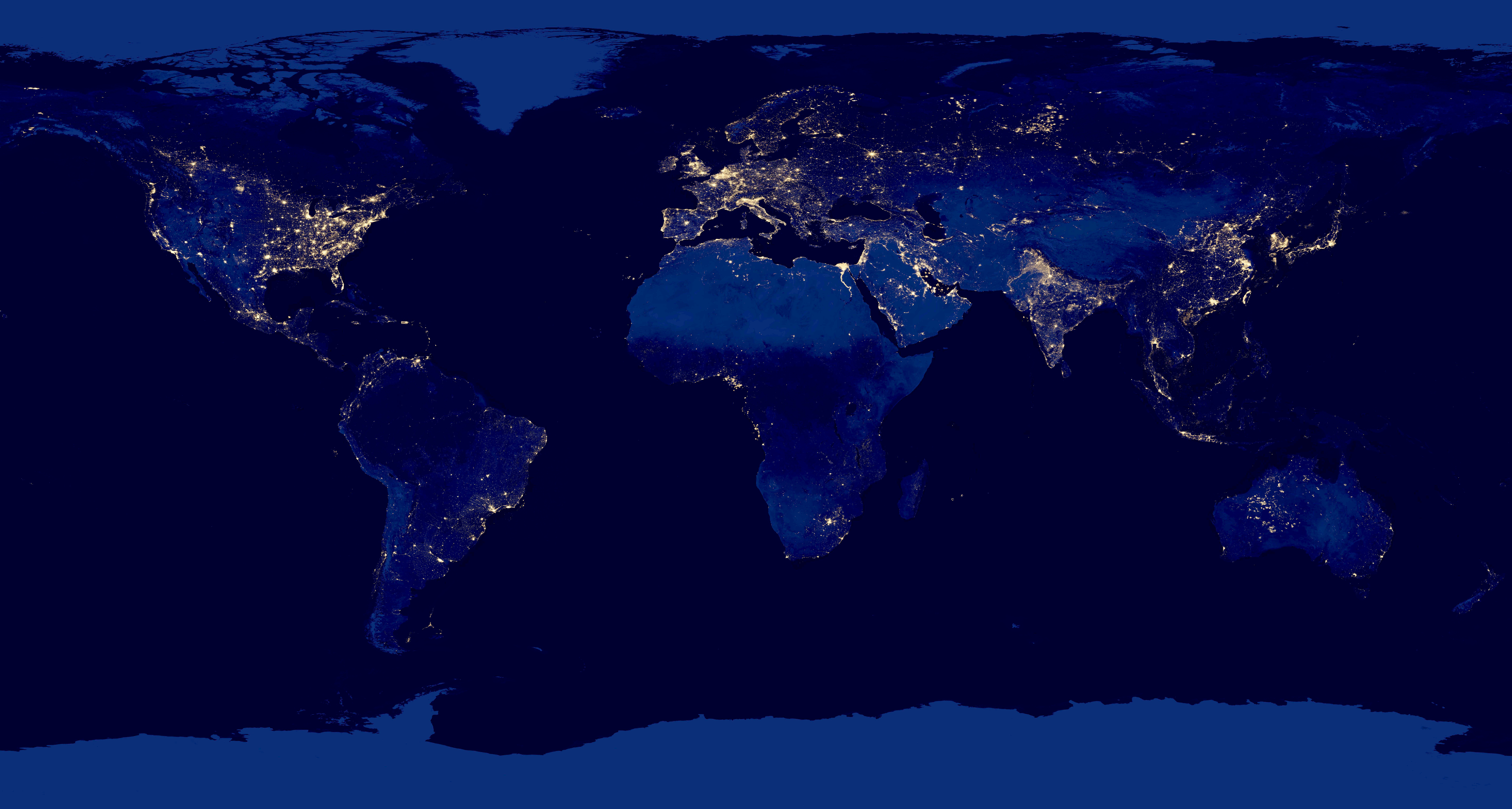
Composite view of the Earth and city lights at night in 2012

The technosphere can be considered one of the spheres of the Earth, like the lithosphere, hydrosphere, atmosphere, pedosphere and biosphere. It includes all non-living human creations, such as buildings, roads, vehicles, power plants, electricity grids, agricultural machinery, books and computers.

== History ==
The term technosphere was first used to refer to the global assemblage of human constructions in a 1960 article by Wil Lepowski. The term was subsequently used by Canadian systems engineer John Milsum in a 1968 article and shortly thereafter by biologist Julian Huxley in a newspaper article reflecting on the first human landing on the moon. None of these writings carefully defined the term, but it was apparently intended to refer to the planetary-scale assemblage of human constructions, in a holistic sense, as a parallel system to the biosphere.

The term is related to the terms Anthroposphere and Noosphere. However, whereas the Anthroposphere is used more broadly to include humans, livestock and managed ecosystems, and the Noosphere more narrowly focused on human rationality, the Technosphere specifically evokes the physical constructions created by humanity. It has been argued that there has been insufficient research on the technosphere, and considerably more study is required to understand how it works as a global system.

== Growth of the Technosphere ==
The Technosphere has grown rapidly since the early 20th century. The global sum of in-use material stocks has increased more than 20-fold, from less than 50 Gt in the year 1900 to more than 1100 Gt in 2020, when it is estimated to have exceeded the combined dry weight of all the organisms of the biosphere. The largest components of the technosphere mass are concrete and aggregates, used in buildings and roads. Projections of future technosphere growth suggest that its mass could exceed 2000 Gt by 2050.
