= Anthroposphere =

Part of the environment that is affected by humans

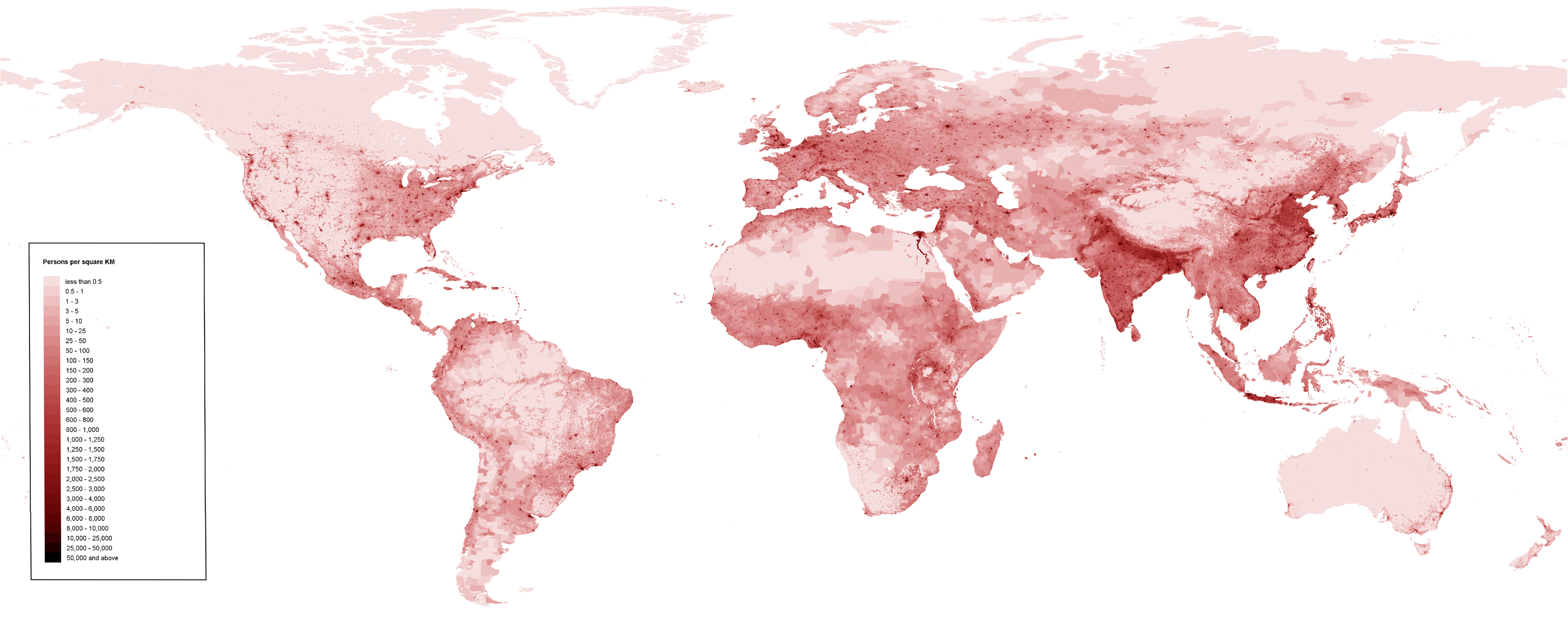
World map of the human population density in 2020

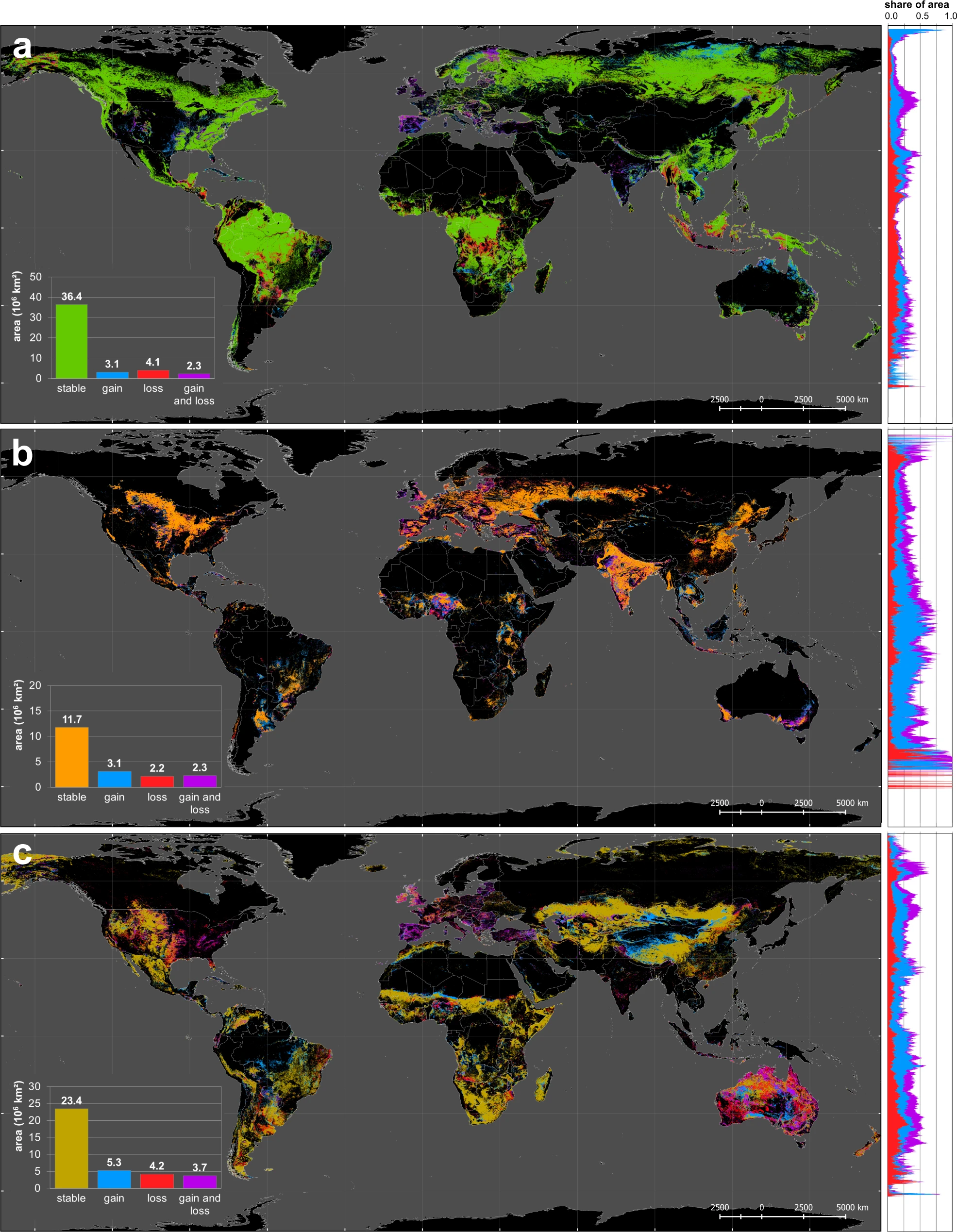
Global distribution of forests (a), cropland (b), and pastures/rangeland (c) changing between 1960 and 2019

The anthroposphere refers to that part of the Earth system that is inhabited and influenced by humans. The term has been included as one of the Earth's spheres, building on a concept coined by Austrian geologist Eduard Suess.

While the biosphere is the total biomass of the Earth and its interaction with its systems, the anthroposphere includes the total mass of human-generated systems and materials, including the human population, crops and livestock, and its interaction with the Earth's systems. A recent study estimated the mass of nonliving anthropogenic creations as 1.1 trillion tons in 2020, equivalent to the mass of all living organisms that comprise the biosphere. As human technology has become more evolved, such as that required to launch objects into orbit or to cause deforestation, the impact of human activities on the environment has increased. The anthroposphere is the youngest of all the Earth's spheres, yet has made an enormous impact on the Earth and its systems in a very short time.

Some consider the term anthroposphere to be synonymous with the noosphere, though the noosphere is often used to refer specifically to the sphere of rational human thought, or ‘the terrestrial sphere of thinking substance’. The anthroposphere is also closely related to the concept of the technosphere developed by geologist Peter Haff, historian of science Jürgen Renn, and others, which refers to all of the technological objects and systems manufactured and created by humans. The technosphere is distinct from the anthroposphere in these sense that the anthroposphere encompasses not only technologies but cultural, social, economic, and political systems, as well as human behaviors and practices.

Aspects of the anthroposphere include: mines from which minerals are obtained; mechanized agriculture and transportation which support the global food system; oil and gas fields; computer-based systems including the Internet; educational systems; landfills; factories; atmospheric pollution; artificial satellites in space, both active satellites and space junk; forestry and deforestation; urban development; transportation systems including roads, highways, and subways; nuclear installations; warfare.

Technofossils are another interesting aspect of the anthroposphere. These can include objects like mobile phones that contain a diverse range of metals and man-made materials, raw materials like aluminum that do not exist in nature, and agglomerations of plastics created in areas like the Pacific Garbage Patch and on the beaches of the Pacific Islands.

== See also ==
- Anthropocene
- Anthropogenic metabolism
- Biomass
- Space junk
