= Caroline Hunt (home economist) =

American home economist

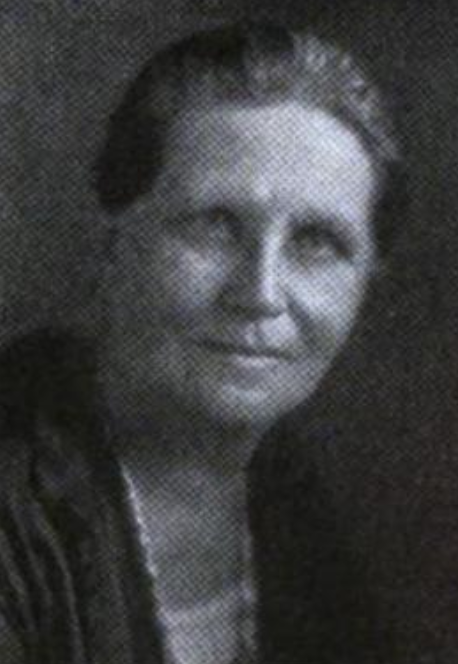
- Caroline L. Hunt from a 1928 publication
- Born: August 23, 1865; Chicago, Illinois
- Died: January 28, 1927; Chicago, Illinois
- Occupation(s): Home economist, college professor

Caroline Louisa Hunt (August 23, 1865 – January 28, 1927) was an American home economist and college professor. She was the author of more than a dozen USDA publications, mostly on foods.

== Early life and education ==
Hunt was born in Chicago, the daughter of Homer Conkey Hunt and Ann Mary Gleed Hunt. Her mother was a teacher, born in England and raised in Canada. Hunt graduated from Northwestern University in 1888, with further studies in chemistry at the University of Chicago.

== Career ==
Hunt had a working relationship with Hull House, and taught at the Lewis Institute from 1896 to 1901, and at Stetson University in Florida from 1903 to 1904. She was a professor of home economics at the University of Wisconsin from 1905 to 1908. She worked for the United States Department of Agriculture, and for the Bureau of Home Economics in the United States Office of Education.

== Publications ==
Many of Hunt's publications were government booklets or pamphlets, on practical topics in home economics.

- Wisdom of the wise; pithy and pointed sayings of the best authors (1891)
- Home Problems from a New Standpoint (1908)
- The Daily Meals of School Children (1909)
- Economical Use of Meat in the Home (1910, with Charles Ford Langworthy)
- The Life of Ellen H. Richards (1912)
- Cheese and Its Economical Uses in the Diet (1912, with Charles Ford Langworthy)
- Mutton and Its Value in the Diet (1913, with Charles Ford Langworthy)
- Honey and Its Uses in the Home (1915, with Helen Woodward Atwater)
- Fresh Vegetables and Fruits as Conservers of Other Staple Foods (1917)
- Bread and Bread Making in the Home (1917)
- Food for Young Children (1917)
- How to Select Foods, I: What the Body Needs (1921)
- Good Proportions in the Diet (1923)

== Personal life ==
Hunt died in Chicago in early 1927.
