= Roy Ellen =

British anthropologist (born 1947)

Roy Frank Ellen
- Born: 1947 (age 78–79); England
- Education: London School of Economics, Leiden University
- Known for: Ethnobiology of Eastern Indonesia
- Scientific career
- Fields: Ethnobiology, Environmental Anthropology
- Workplaces: University of Kent at Canterbury.

Roy Frank Ellen, FBA FRAI (born 1947) is a British professor of anthropology and human ecology, with a particular interest in ethnobiology and the cultural transmission of ethnobiological knowledge.

Ellen is a professor of environmental anthropology and ethnobiology at the University of Kent at Canterbury. He studied anthropology at the London School of Economics and Leiden and is most known for his extensive fieldwork in East Indonesia with the Nuaulu people of Seram. Ellen started his fieldwork in the early 1970s and has remained active in the field of environmental anthropology through publishing, teaching and field research. Throughout Ellen's career, especially in his published works there is a reoccurring theme and emphasis on the transmission of cultural knowledge as well as the importance of the history and knowledge of indigenous people.

The British Academy in a 2003 Review describes him, his work, and his contribution to society as follows:

"His work is at the forefront of ecological anthropology. He has recently embarked on a series of major studies of indigenous knowledge and of the consequences of deforestation in parts of Indonesia and in Brunei. He has also contributed notably to work on anthropological history and method."

== Primary research area ==
Ellen has been carrying out ethnobiological fieldwork in eastern Indonesia since the early 1970s, working variously with the Nuaulu people of Seram (with whom he did his doctoral dissertation); on the islands of Sulawesi, Gorom, Seram Laut, Banda and Ambon-Lease; plus some addition fieldwork into the social impacts of logging at Brunei (1991–1994).

== Early publishing ==
Ellen tackled the debate between nature and culture. Stating that the conception of nature has varied historically and ethnographically and as a result has become cultural. A popular environmental discourse in which the opposition is drawn between the holistic systemic vision of what is viewed as traditional or tribal and the dualism of the modern scientific Christian tradition. In his view nature has become some topological grid dividing the civilised and the uncivilised, which has led to the rejection of the very idea of nature. This view and the different conceptions of nature have given rise to many problems and thus have given ways to assumptions and implications that it is our task to locate and excavate nature (Ellen, 1996).

Ellen proposes ways to deal with the categorical status of nature. The first of which is to acknowledge that any one population may generate their own conceptions of nature, which may be inconsistent and contradictory from one another and some may have no concept of nature whatsoever, but it must be acknowledged. The second is to bring down this trend and be able to identify the minimum number of underlying assumptions in which these conceptions are built so as to alleviate the contrasting points of views about nature and focus on the multi-faceted, but ultimately recognisable idea of nature (Ellen, 1988). Dr. Ellen also uses his extensive experience with the Nuaulu to draw on as an example to begin identifying and cultivating cultural phenomena, which explores and permits us to the existence of nature as a domain (Ellen, 1993).

He also emphasises the indigenous knowledge of the rainforest in preserving the identity and culture of indigenous people whose ways of life are threatened. He had observed that historically the indigenous people have perceived and interacted with the rainforest in many diverse ways. Diversity has been obscured with the process of globalisation and the undertaking of oversimplifying the relationships, which the people have established with the forest. He implores conservationists to take indigenous knowledge into account and form a judgment based on evidence for that particular situation and not generalisation (Ellen, 1993). Dr. Ellen recognises that individual subsistence techniques differ among particular populations and have different ecological profiles when it comes to energy transfer, limiting factors, and carrying capacity. The effect on the landscape is varied and is due to the degree of human effort that is required. Empirical knowledge of plants and animals and its broad understanding allows them to comfortably co-exist together and gives way to claims of mutual causation that gives rise to a complex notion of nature He includes that although uncut forest is recognised by Nuaulu as a single entity, it contrasts in different ways with other land types depending on context. The Nuaulu's concept of their environment is not one of space in which they traverse, but more like a series of fixed points to which particular clans and individuals are interconnected. These interconnections are practical implications between social and environmental and can be very important (Ellen, 1993). Dr. Ellen's main view, which is perhaps the most important, is that indigenous knowledge and practices must be understood contextually. Outsiders must begin to separate prejudices about our environment and we must apply formal knowledge to different situations. Indigenous knowledge of the rainforest is always situational and varies and ever-changing depending on the situation at hand (Ellen, 1994).

== Recent publishing ==
Ellen focuses on the importance of indigenous ecological knowledge and practices and collaborations between local and outside knowledge effect and ultimately construct culture and how society functions. This paper will cover some of Ellen's more recent publishing (ranging from 1997 to 2006) in Seram, Eastern Indonesia and West Java.

Ellen's article "Local and Scientific Understanding of Forest Diversity on Seram, Eastern Indonesia" published in 2006, is an excellent literary example of the importance and relevance local environmental knowledge has in scientific understanding. The article follows the process of how forest departments try to understand and label the forested territory surrounding the Nuaulu people in linear, homogenous terms. This proves to be problematic because of the extensive diversity and 'patchiness' of the forest. Through collaboration of folk and scientific classifications Ellen believes that a conclusion can be found, stating that, "Scientific and folk classifications have coevolved in recent global history, and the relationship between folk knowledge and instituted scientific knowledge can be modeled as two interacting and mutually reinforcing streams (Ellen 2006:64)." As seen through many of Ellen's works, the detailed emphasis on the emic view, and the local knowledge are not only the most important but also give agency to the people using that environment. In this case, the Nuaulu, in light of the failure of the forest department to "map" the forest were given recognition of their ecological knowledge and proved that top-down models are not always the most functional or correct.

Ellen's article "The Contribution of Paraserianthes (Albizia) falcataria to Sustainable Swidden Management Practices among the Baduy of West Java" published in 2000, the Baduy, which maintain their cultural identity through swidden agriculture, also understand to maintain their traditional way of life they must integrate cash crops to sustain themselves. This case is an example of how through a successful collaboration between local and outside parties can bring about solutions to sustainability problems. The reason this 'hybridisation' was successful is because the Baduy ultimately decided for themselves that the Albizia was an acceptable addition to their traditional swidden farming. This integration was not forced upon or mandated by the government and the "local population could consider the advantages and disadvantages of the introduction and make the decision for themselves (Ellen 2000:14).”

Through these two published works of professor Ellen, it is obvious that he covers a wide array of ecological topics as well as political topics in his publishings. He focuses on the indigenous people and their contributions, knowledge and transmission of culture. Like most anthropologists, Ellen is focused on giving locals agency and highlighting areas in which this is and is not occurring. Through his extensive field work in Seram and with the Nuaulu the local environmental knowledge of a culture cannot be denied and is highlighted in many of his works as paramount.

== Contributions to anthropology ==
Ellen has influenced many fields of anthropology including cultural ecology contributing to the knowledge base of ethno-biology, and environmental anthropology among others. One of Ellen's strengths is his ability to connect themes and theories to create a more holistic depiction of an issue. His work offers a unique synergistic perspective on human cultural evolution and our relationship to the environment. He believes they co-exist but are not static and can change according to circumstances overtime. His findings have informed the studies of subsistence behaviours, the social impact of deforestation, inter- island trade and questions the relationship between nature and culture. "Forest Knowledge, Forest Transformation: Political Contingency, Historical Ecology, and the Renegotiation of Nature in Central Seram”(2008) is one of Ellen's most influential works. He applied a historical perspective to understand the Nuaulu's current relationship with nature. He offered that nature co-evolves with humans. Changes that have accelerated in the last 20 years such as cash cropping and forest extraction have renegotiated the Nuaulu's relationship with nature. “How people conceptualize nature depends on how they use it, how they transform it, and how in doing so they invest knowledge in a different part of it” (2008: 326). He is influenced by Leslie White's energy capture theory. The technology available has a great impact and changes people's perception of nature, as it is instrumental in the evolution and advancement of our species.

The work of Ellen contributed to anthropologist's understanding of the interrelationship between nature and culture and helped anthropology contribute to practical debates that depend on definitions of nature such as sustainable development. He focused on the evolution and transmission of ecological knowledge and environmental stress in the context of sustainable development. In response to environmental stress, or instability such as political conflict or economic hazards he found that traditional knowledge enables local populations to cope. Ellen theorised that humans needed to adjust to new conditions, cope with dangers or improve existing conditions through modifications to their behaviour. He found individuals adapt through their economic and social relationships.

Ellen's research helps understand the ways in which culture and nature are synergistic and important to human evolution. Humans have used nature by living in it and assimilating it into culture as humans have evolved.

Ellen is one of the foremost British anthropologists associated with ethno-biology and has made major contributions to field. Ellen helped renew interest in the study of classification with his book "Categorical impulse: Essays on the Anthropology of classifying behavior”(2008). In the book he synthesised the studies of cognitive and ethno-sciences with symbolic anthropology providing a holistic perspective on classification. Ellen's new approach attempted to bridge the gap between the two contradictory approaches of cultural and cognitive by using a more processual approach and “cross- fertilizing” the two. He engaged both psychological and anthropological ideas to combine the two approaches effectively. He believed that the existing assumptions of cultural uniformity on the ethnographic analysis of categories were not correct, as variation was evident. He used the animal classifications of the Nuaulu people to present his point. His point being that in regards to the classifications of animals made by the Nuaulu people, one must pay attention to different types and contexts of variation. According to Ellen, “In a single body of data there may be variation according to many criteria which are often cross-cutting and reinforce each other irregularly.”(1979: 337) There are various reasons and ways people classify and categorise as a result of both culture construction and the cognitive approach. Ellen states what he believes to be inevitable is the fact that the “products of classifying behavior reflect the immediate social conditions of the situations in which they are used”(1979: 337). In other words, factors such as environment, culture, society and the state in which they exist are heavily influential on the way people classify things.

== Distinctions ==
- 2001 Elected Fellow of the Linnean Society of London
- 2003 Elected Fellow of British Academy
- 2003-2006 Vice-President, Royal Anthropological Institute of Great Britain and Ireland
- 2004-2006 President, Anthropology and Archaeology Section, British Association for the Advancement of Science
- 2007-2009 President, Royal Anthropological Institute of Great Britain and Ireland

== Personal life ==
Ellen is married.

== Brief bibliography of works ==
=== Books published ===
Ellen's published books include:

- ELLEN, Roy (1978) Nuaulu settlement and ecology. The environmental relations of an eastern Indonesian community. No.83 Martinus Nijhoff: The Hague.
- ELLEN, Roy (1982) Environment, subsistence and system: the ecology of small-scale social formations. Cambridge: Cambridge University Press.
- ELLEN, Roy (1993) The cultural relations of classification: an analysis of Nuaulu animal categories from central Seram. Cambridge : Cambridge University Press.
- ELLEN, Roy (1993) Nuaulu ethnozoology : a systematic inventory. Canterbury: Centre for Social Anthropology and Computing, University of Kent at Canterbury in co-operation with the Centre of South-East Asian Studies.
- ELLEN, Roy (1993) On the edge of the Banda zone: past and present in the social organisation of a Moluccan trading network. Honolulu: University of Hawai'i Press
- ELLEN, Roy (2006) The categorical impulse: essays in the anthropology of classifying behaviour. Oxford: Berghahn.
- ELLEN, Roy (2012) Nuaulu religious practices: the frequency and reproduction of rituals in a Moluccan society. Leiden: KITLV.

=== Books edited ===
- ELLEN, Roy & BURNHAM, P.H (Eds) (1979) Social and ecological systems. Association of Social Anthropologists Monograph No.18. London: Academic Press.
- ELLEN, Roy & REASON, D (Eds) (1979) Classifications in their social context. London: Academic Press
- ELLEN, Roy (Ed) (1984) Ethnographic research: a guide to general conduct. Association of Social Anthropologists Research Methods Series No.1. London: Academic Press.
- ELLEN, Roy, Gellner, E. et al. (Ed) (1988) Malinowski between two worlds: the Polish roots of an anthropological tradition. Cambridge: Cambridge University Press.
- ELLEN, Roy & WATSON, C.W. (Eds) (1993) Understanding witchcraft and sorcery in Southeast Asia. Honolulu: University of Hawaii Press
- ELLEN, Roy & FUKUI, K. (Eds) (1996) Redefining nature: ecology, culture and domestication. Oxford: Berg
- ELLEN, Roy; PARKES, P; & BICKER, A (Eds) (2000) Indigenous environmental knowledge and its transformations. Amsterdam: Harwood
- ELLEN, Roy (Ed) (2006) Ethnobiology and the science of humankind. Journal Royal Anthropological Institute Special Issue. Oxford: Blackwell.
