= Culture system =

Culture system may refer to:

- Cultivation System in Dutch-governed Indonesia
- Cultural system
