= Cognized environment =

Anthropological concept

Cognized environment is a concept first introduced by the late anthropologist Roy Rappaport (1968), in contrast to what he called the operational environment. Rappaport was an ecological anthropologist, like Andrew P. Vayda, and wished to contrast the actual reality and adaptations (the operational environment) within a people's ecological niche – say, the existence of tsetse flies and their role in causing sleeping sickness among humans – with how the people's culture understands nature (the cognized environment) – say, the belief that witches live in those areas that science knows is the habitat of the tsetse. Rappaport's principal concern was the role of ritual in mediating the cognized and operational environments.

Another group of anthropologists later took up the use of Rappaport's concepts and applied them toward developing a school of neuroanthropology called biogenetic structuralism (see Laughlin and Brady 1978: 6, d'Aquili, Laughlin and McManus 1979: 12ff, Rubinstein, Laughlin and McManus 1984: 21ff, and Laughlin, McManus and d'Aquili 1990:82-90). According to this group, all properties and qualities of experience are mediated by our body's neuroendocrine systems. These systems function individually and collectively to model reality. The sum total of these models in the brain is the cognized environment. The operational environment refers to the actual niche in which the human or other animal with a brain dwells and adapts. The operational environment is the real world that is modelled by our cognized environment.

== See also ==
- Umwelt
