= Traditional ecological knowledge =

Indigenous and other traditional knowledge of local ecology

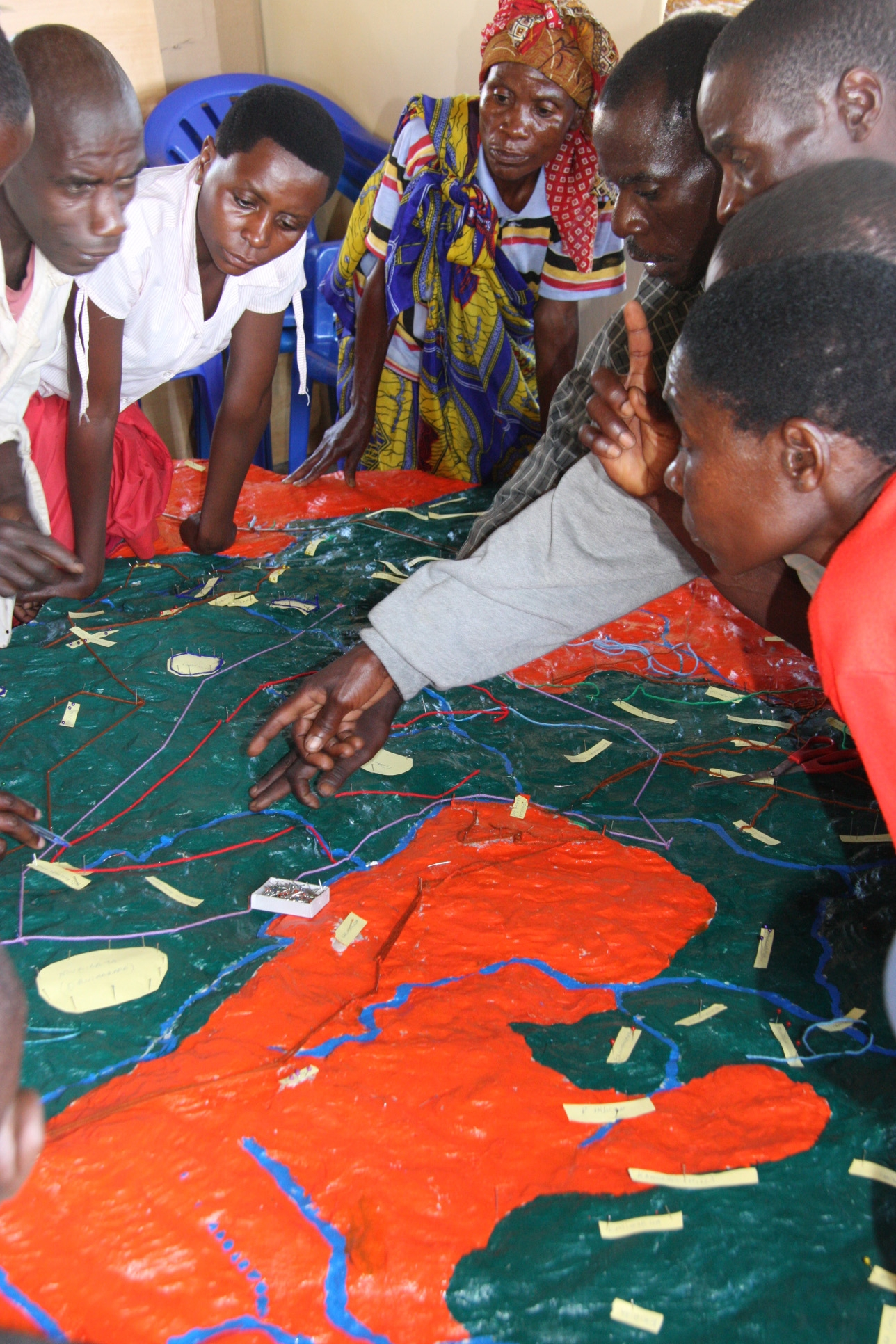
Batwa participants in a Forest Peoples Programme-sponsored project contributing their knowledge to a relief map of a forested area.

Traditional ecological knowledge (TEK) is a cumulative body of knowledge, practice, and belief, evolving by adaptive processes and handed down through generations by cultural transmission, about the relationship of living beings (including humans) with one another and with their environment. (Note: There is no single definition for traditional ecological knowledge and some prefer other terms for the same or similar concepts. The definition given here is from the fourth edition of Fikret Berkes' Sacred Ecology which has evolved through work and consultation dating back to 1993.)

The integration of TEK into ecological management has been debated, as traditional knowledge is often based on long-term observation, cultural methods, and experiential learning, rather than the standardized experimental and quantitative methods typical of Western ecological science. These differences in knowledge acquisition and validation have led to discussions about how TEK can be effectively and respectfully incorporated into ecological studies and ecological management. Non-tribal government agencies, such as the U.S. EPA, have established integration programs with some tribal governments in order to incorporate TEK in environmental plans and climate change tracking. In contrast to the universality towards which contemporary academic pursuits often aim, TEK does not function as a universal set of principles, but as a family of culturally situated rules and practices rooted in specific places and ecological worldviews.

There is an ongoing debate in international law and policy about whether Indigenous peoples retain intellectual property rights over traditional knowledge and whether third parties should be required to obtain prior informed consent or a licence before using such knowledge. The WIPO Treaty on Intellectual Property, Genetic Resources and Associated Traditional Knowledge addresses disclosure requirements and benefit-sharing when traditional knowledge or associated genetic resources are used in intellectual property filings. This is especially complicated because TEK is most frequently preserved as oral tradition and as such may lack objectively confirmed documentation. As such, the same methods that could resolve the issue of documentation to meet legal requirements may compromise the very nature of traditional knowledge.

Traditional knowledge informs Indigenous horticulture and stewardship practices that maintain and, in some cases, enhance plan and animal populations relied upon for subsistence. While TEK and the communities which contain it are often marginalized within dominant scientific and societal frameworks, they provide valuable perspectives that can contextualize environmental change.

== History ==
"The earliest systematic studies of TEK were done by anthropologists. Ecological knowledge was studied through the lens of ethnoecology (an approach that focuses on the conceptions of ecological relationships held by a people or a culture)..." in understanding how systems of knowledge were developed by a given culture. Harold Colyer Conklin, an American anthropologist took the lead in documenting indigenous ways of understanding the natural world. Conklin and others documented how traditional peoples, such as Philippine horticulturists, had detailed knowledge about the plants and animals where they resided. Direct involvement in gathering, fashioning products from, and using local plants and animals created a scheme in which the biological world and the cultural world were tightly intertwined. The field of TEK encompasses a broad range of questions related to cultural ecology and ecological anthropology by emphasizing the study of human-nature relations, adaptive processes, which argues that social organization itself is an ecological adaptational response by a group to its local environment, and the practical techniques on which these relationships and culture depend.

in 1987 report, Our Common Future, by the World Commission on Environment and Development was published by the United Nations. The report points out that the successes of the 20th century (decreases in infant mortality, increases in life expectancy, increases in literacy, and global food production) have given rise to trends that have caused environmental degradation "in an ever more polluted world among ever decreasing resources." The report declared that tribal and indigenous peoples had lifestyles that could provide modern societies with lessons for management of resources in complex forest, mountain, and dryland ecosystems.

Fulvio Mazzocchi of the Italian National Research Council's Institute of Atmospheric Pollution outlines the characteristics of TEK as follows:

Traditional knowledge has developed a concept of the environment that emphasizes the symbiotic character of humans and nature. It offers an approach to local development that is based on co‐evolution with the environment, and on respecting the carrying capacity of ecosystems. This knowledge--based on long‐term empirical observations adapted to local conditions--ensures a sound use and control of the environment, and enables indigenous people to adapt to environmental changes. Moreover, it supplies much of the world's population with the principal means to fulfil their basic needs, and forms the basis for decisions and strategies in many practical aspects, including interpretation of meteorological phenomena, medical treatment, water management, production of clothing, navigation, agriculture and husbandry, hunting and fishing, and biological classification systems.... Beyond its obvious benefit for the people who rely on this knowledge, it might provide humanity as a whole with new biological and ecological insights; it has potential value for the management of natural resources and might be useful in conservation education as well as in development planning and environmental assessment.

Some anthropologists, such as M. Petriello and A. Stronza, warn that presenting TEK as an "indigenous" construct will cause the privileging of certain types of TEK over others and restricting which groups are thought to possess TEK results in reduced understanding of and collaboration with groups such as campesinos who while not often classified as "indigenous" nevertheless possess TEK. The term TEK has been criticised as a form of intellectual appropriation that modifies traditional/indigenous knowledges to better fit a conventional Western modern science framework.

== Aspects of traditional ecological knowledge ==
Nicholas Houde, in an article published in Ecology and Society, identifies six facets of traditional ecological knowledge: factual observations, management systems, past and current uses, ethics and values, culture and identity, and cosmology. These aspects emphasize how "cooperative management [can] better identify areas of difference and convergence when attempting to bring two ways of thinking and knowing together."

=== Factual observations ===
The first aspect of traditional ecological knowledge incorporates the factual, specific observations generated by recognition, naming, and classification of discrete components of the environment. This type of "empirical knowledge consists of a set of generalized observations conducted over a long period of time and reinforced by accounts of other TEK holders."

=== Management systems ===
The second facet refers to the ethical and sustainable use of resources in regards to management systems. More specifically, issues such as dealing with pest management, resource conversion, multiple cropping patterns, and methods for estimating the state of resources can be thought of as part of such management systems. How resource management can adapt to local environments is another crucial aspect of such considerations.

=== Past and current uses ===
The third facet refers to the time dimension of TEK, focusing on past and current uses of the environment transmitted through oral history, such as land use, settlement, occupancy, and harvest levels. Oral history is used to transmit cultural heritage generation to generation about such topics as medicinal plants and the existence of historical sites, and contributes to a sense of family and community.

=== Ethics and values ===
The fourth facet refers to value statements and connections between the belief system and the organization of facts. In regards to TEK it refers to environmental ethics that keeps exploitative abilities in check. This facet also refers to the expression of values concerning the relationship with the habitats of species and their surrounding environment - the human-relationship environment.

=== Culture and identity ===
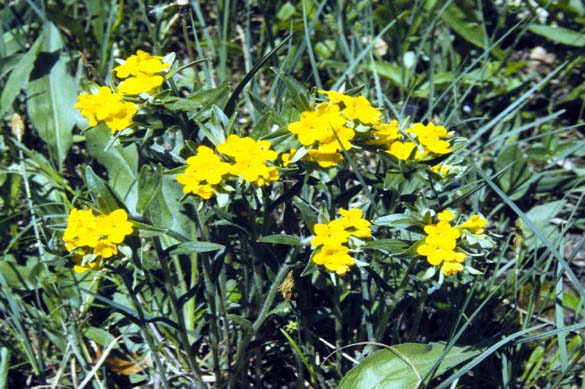
Traditional ecological knowledge frequently relates to knowledge surrounding plants and foliage.

The fifth facet refers to the role of language and images of the past giving life to culture. This facet reflects the stories, values, and social relations that reside in places as contributing to the survival, reproduction, and evolution of aboriginal cultures, and identities while stressing "the restorative benefits of cultural landscapes as places for renewal."

=== Cosmology ===
The sixth facet is a culturally based cosmology, a system of beliefs and assumptions that underpins other aspects of a society. It shapes how people understand how the world works, how its elements are connected, and the place of humans within it. Traditional knowledge varies widely across cultures and are expressed and passed on through language, particularly through myth and symbolic terms that convey principles guiding human–animal relations, interactions with the natural environment, and broader ideas about existence.

== Ecosystem management ==
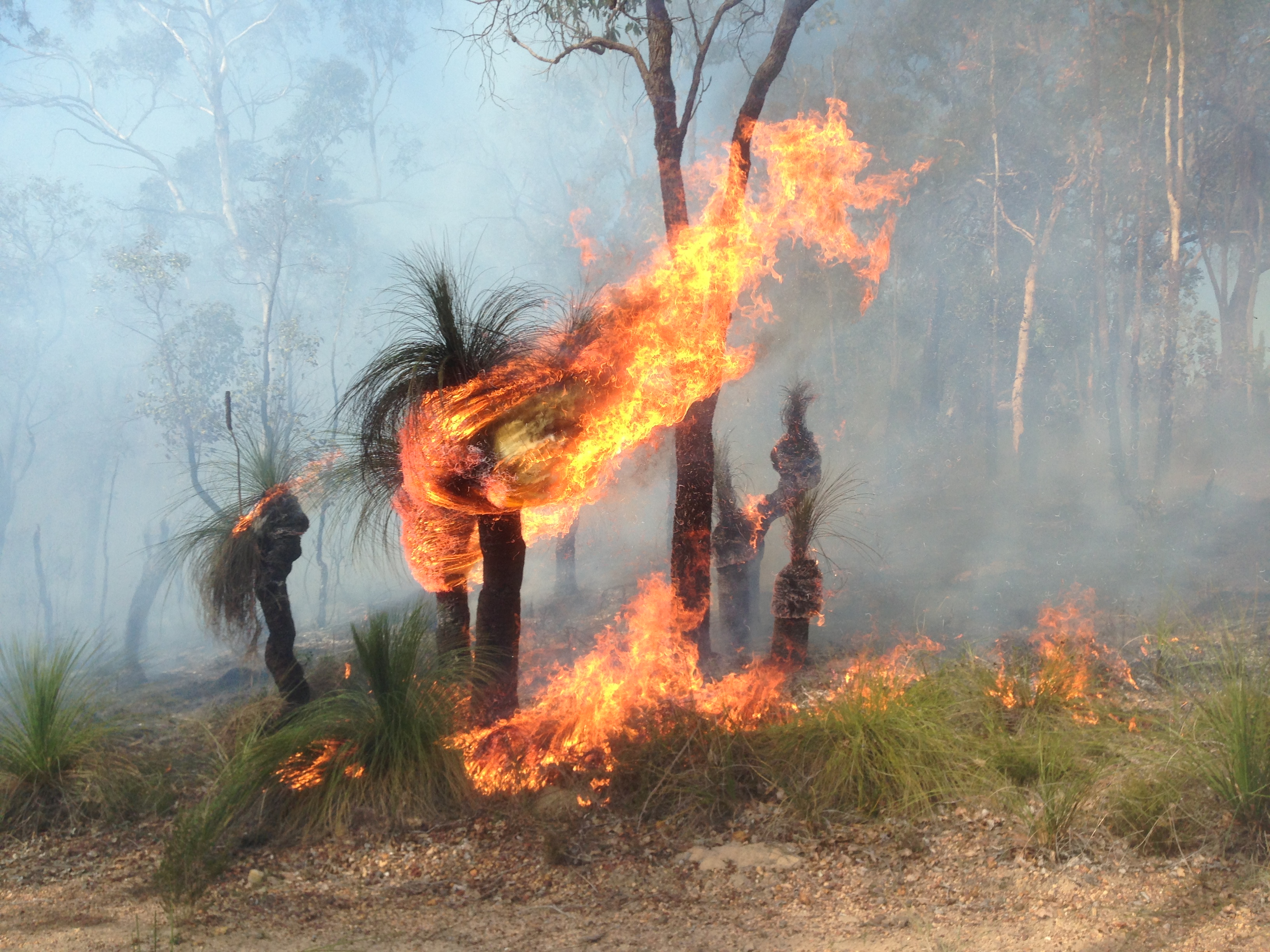
An example of this is the Australian government giving back land to the Aboriginal people to practice their tradition of controlled fires. This made the areas more biologically diverse and decreased the threat of wildfires and their severity.

Ecosystem management is a multifaceted approach to natural resource management that can incorporate science and TEK to collate long-term measurements that would otherwise be unavailable. This can be achieved by scientists and researchers collaborating with Indigenous peoples through a consensus decision-making process while meeting the socioeconomic, political and cultural needs of current and future generations. Concerns over instances where indigenous knowledge has been used without consent (cultural appropriation), acknowledgment, or compensation have been raised by some critics.

=== Ecological restoration ===
Ecological restoration is the practice of restoring a degraded ecosystem through human intervention. There are many links between ecological restoration and ecosystem management practices involving TEK. Due to the aforementioned unequal power between indigenous and non-indigenous peoples, equitable partnerships formed in theses contexts can help mitigate extant social injustices, as in the case when Indigenous Peoples lead ecological restoration projects.

=== Effects of environmental degradation ===
In some areas, environmental degradation has led to a decline in traditional ecological knowledge. For example, at the Aamjiwnaang community of Anishnaabe First Nations people in Sarnia, Ontario, Canada, residents suffer from a "noticeable decrease in male birth ratio ..., which residents attribute to their proximity to petrochemical plants".

== Climate change ==
Indigenous people and Climate Change: fact sheet about the health impacts of climate change on indigenous populations

Climate change is affecting indigenous people in different ways depending on the geographic region which require different adaption and mitigation actions. For example, to immediately deal with these conditions, the indigenous people adjust when they harvest and what they harvest and also adjust their resource use. Climate change can change the accuracy of the information of TEK. The indigenous people have relied on indicators in nature to plan activities and even for short- term weather predictions. As a result of ever more increasingly unusual conditions, entire indigenous cultures have been disrupted and displaced. As a result, there is a loss of the cultural ties to the lands they once resided on and there is also a loss of the traditional ecological knowledge they had with the land there. Climate change adaptations have the potential to harm indigenous rights. The US EPA promised to take traditional ecological knowledge into consideration in planning adaptations to climate change.

The rising temperature poses a threat for ecosystems including the locations where plants grow, the times that insects emerge throughout the year, and changes to the seasonal habitats of animals. For many harvesting seasons, indigenous people have shifted their activity months earlier due to impacts from climate change, adaptations that becomes more important in the face of a rapidly changing climate. Climate change can therefore affect the availability and quality of environmental resources for indigenous people. For example, as sea ice levels decrease, Alaska Native peoples have experienced changes in their daily lives. Thawing permafrost has damaged buildings and roadways while clean water resources dwindle. Fishing, transportation, social and economic aspects of their lives are destabilized. Additionally, as the temperature gets hotter, disasters such as uncontrolled wild fires become more likely. One Indigenous nation in Australia was recently given back land and they reinstated their traditional practice of controlled burning. This was documented to increase the area's biodiversity and decrease the severity of the wildfires. Traditional ecological knowledge can help provide information about climate change across generations and geography of the actual residents in the area. The National Resource Conservation Service of the United States Department of Agriculture has used methods of the indigenous people to combat climate change conditions.

== Examples ==
Instances where TEK was recognized in the literature are included below.

=== Karuk and Yurok Burning ===
Environmental sociologist Kirsten Vinyeta and tribal climate change researcher Kathy Lynn reported on the Karuk Tribe of California: "Traditional burning practices have been critical to the Karuk since time immemorial. For the Tribe, fire serves as a critical land management tool as well as a spiritual practice." Environmental studies professor Tony Marks-Block, ecological researcher Frank K. Lake, and tropical forester Lisa M. Curran explained how the Karuk and the Yurok Tribes organized controlled burns and fuel reduction treatments in their ancestral territories to reduce wildfire risk and "restore ecocultural resources depleted from decades of fire exclusion". Professor of sociology Kari Norgaard and Karuk tribe member William Tripp recommend "this process... be replicated and expanded to other communities throughout the western Klamath Mountains and beyond" to promote the positive outcomes seen as a result of the custodial burns of these tribes.

=== Anishinabe Ecological Conservation ===
Indigenous philosopher and climate/environmental justice scholar Kyle Powys Whyte writes "Anishinaabek/Neshnabék throughout the Great Lakes region are at the forefront of native species conservation and ecological restoration projects that seek to learn from, adapt, and put into practice local human and nonhuman relationships and stories at the convergence of deep Anishinaabe history and the disruptiveness of industrial settler campaigns."

=== Lummi Nation of Washington State Conservation of Southern Resident Killer Whales ===
Ecological scholars Paul Guernsey, Kyle Keeler and Lummi member Jeremiah Julius describe in a paper how "In 2018, the Lummi Nation dedicated itself to a Totem Pole Journey across the United States calling for the return of their relative "Lolita" (a Southern Resident Killer Whale) to her home waters.... [additionally] asking for NOAA to collaborate in feeding the whales until the chinook runs of the Puget Sound can sustain them."

=== Agroforestry in northeast India ===
In India, indigenous knowledge relating to agroforestry has been passed down for generations. One paper suggests mitigating the negative impacts of colonial-era and more recent corporate land management practices could be achieved through a revival of traditional farming methods.

One traditional farming practice is jhum, also known as shifting cultivation or "slash and burn". This is a common practice in northeastern India, where sections of land are regularly burned and returned to after the soil's fertility is restored. The practice of jhum heightens carbon storage and biodiversity. Jhum paired with certain plant-based pesticides was demonstrated to create an agroforestry structure that could function without dependence on industrial fertilizers and pesticides.

== See also ==
- Agroecology
- Braiding Sweetgrass
- Clam garden
- Non-timber forest product
- Traditional knowledge
- African insect TEK
- Indigenous science
