= Sociocultural system =

Human population viewed in context

A sociocultural system is a "human population viewed (1) in its ecological context and (2) as one of the many subsystems of a larger ecological system".

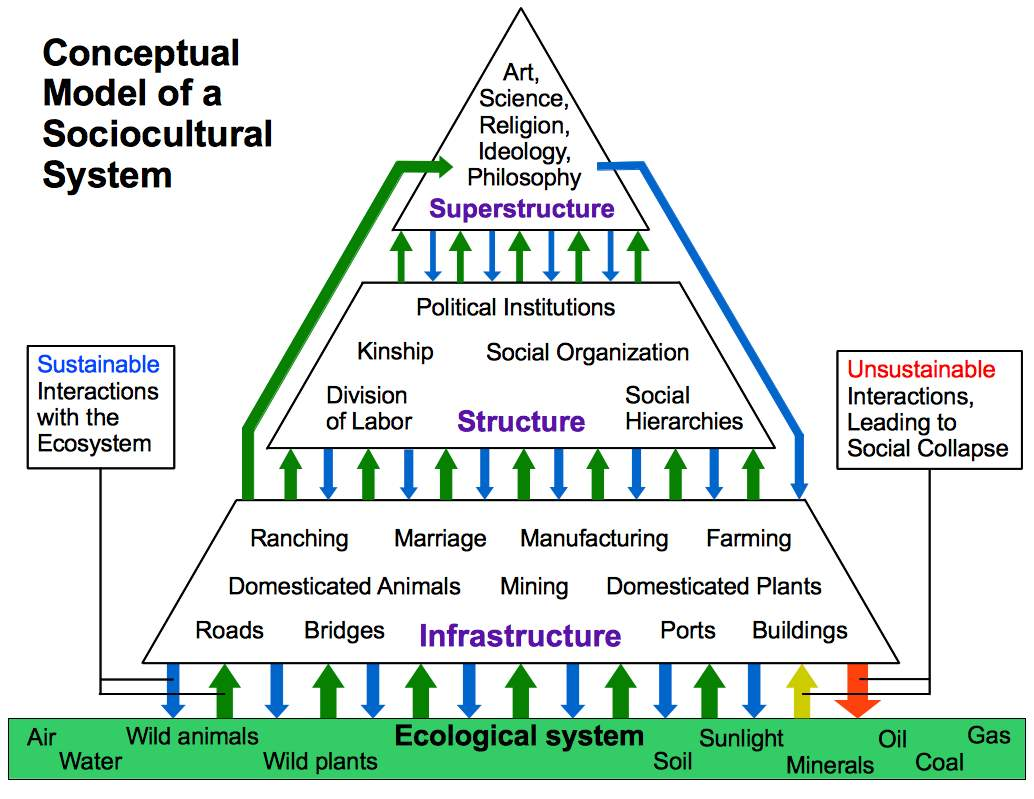
Conceptual model of a sociocultural system

The term "sociocultural system. " embraces three concepts: society, culture, and system. A society is several interdependent organisms of the same species. A culture is the learned behaviors that are shared by the members of society, together with the material products of such behaviors. The words "society" and "culture" are fused together to form the word "sociocultural". A system is "a collection of parts which interact with each other to function as a whole". The term sociocultural system is most likely to be found in the writings of anthropologists who specialize in ecological anthropology.

In 1979, Marvin Harris outlined a universal structure of sociocultural systems. He mentioned infrastructure (production and population), structure (which is behavioural, like corporations, political organizations, hierarchies, castes), and a superstructure (which is mental, like beliefs, values, norms).

== See also ==
- Conrad Phillip Kottak – American anthropologist
- Cultural system – Interaction of different elements in culture
- Roy Rappaport – American anthropologist
- Societal collapse – Fall of a complex human society
- Sociocultural perspective – Theory in psychology and education
- Sustainability – Societal goal and normative concept
- Systems theory – Interdisciplinary study of systems
- Systems thinking – Examining complex systems as a whole
- Zeitgeist – Philosophical and sociological concept meaning "spirit of the age"
