= Maring =

Maring may refer to:

- Maring people, a tribe of Manipur, northeast India
  - Maring language (India), their Sino-Tibetan language
- Tsembaga Maring tribe, a tribe in Papua New Guinea
  - Maring language, of New Guinea
- Henk Sneevliet (1883–1942), Dutch communist politician, known by the pseudonym "Maring"

== See also ==
- Maring Naga (disambiguation)
- Maeringas, an Ostrogothic tribe; see Rök runestone
