= Nunavut Municipal Training Organization =

School for municipal staff in Nunavut, Canada

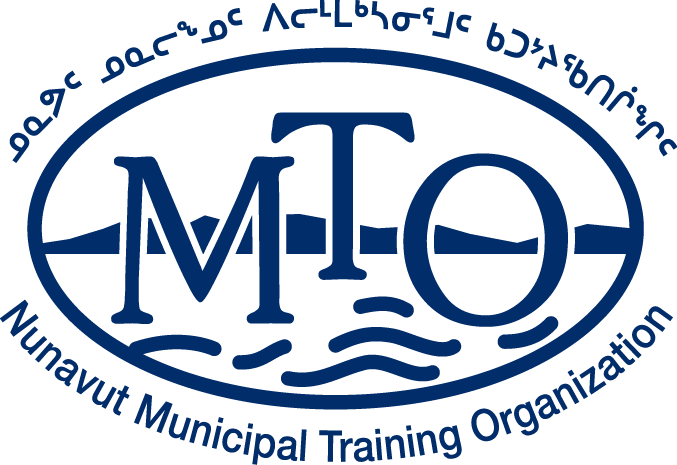
Nunavut Municipal Training Organization

The Nunavut Municipal Training Organization (MTO) is a school for municipal staff throughout the Territory of Nunavut. Training is primarily geared towards the staff of Inuit communities in Canada's far north. Since its inception, the work of the Nunavut Municipal Training Organization (MTO) has evolved into three core activities; Training Programs, Program Development/Enhancement, and improving municipal operations in Nunavut's 25 communities. The training itself is divided into three main categories: the college-accredited Municipal Government Program through the Nunavut Arctic College, Protection Services training, and community-targeted training courses.

== History ==
In 2002, the new territory of Nunavut was just three years old and beginning to discover the infrastructure needed to maintain 25 municipalities. The Nunavut Association of Municipal Administrators (NAMA) and the Government of Nunavut's Department of Community Government & Transportation created a steering committee which began the work of developing structures, courses, budgets and protocols to meet the training needs identified by municipalities at the time. The resulting recommendations led to the incorporation of the MTO as a legal non-profit society in February 2003.

== Mandate ==
The MTO's mandate since its inception has been To identify, develop and implement training programs that will improve the performance of municipalities through training, education and professional development.

== Governance & Oversight ==
The MTO membership is made up of each senior administration officer from Nunavut's 25 municipalities. At the annual general meeting each fall, the membership elects members to the MTO board of directors. The Government of Nunavut appoints two members to the board as well. The full-time executive director reports to the MTO board, and supervises MTO staff and operations. The current president is Steve England; senior administration officer with the Hamlet of Arviat.

== Training ==
=== Municipal Government Program ===
The Municipal Government Program (MGP) was launched in September 2004 as part of the Nunavut Arctic College's 2004/05 school year. This program consists of numerous single credit courses delivered in a blended format (some online courses, some face-to-face courses). Completion of five core courses and an additional five courses in any specialty stream (Finance, Senior Administration Officer, Works Foreman, Recreation Director, Office Administrator, Bylaw Officer, and Lands Officer) will lead to a Diploma in Municipal Government from the Nunavut Arctic College. As part of its strategy to increase participation in these college-accredited courses, the MTO Board authorized the issuance of 1,500 aeroplan miles to each MGP course participant in 2016/17.

=== Protection Services ===
The MTO provides all firefighter training for municipal fire departments through practical, kinaesthetic, face-to-face courses which incorporate the principles of Inuit Qaujimajatuqangit (IQ).

The MTO also provides comprehensive Ground Search & Rescue training for local search & rescue groups. The courses were designed to meet national standards but have been modified extensively to incorporate local knowledge and community elders often participate in order to pass along knowledge.

The MTO is a partner of the Canadian Red Cross and has trained community members to teach First Aid & CPR in Inuktitut for both community members and municipal staff.

=== Targeted Training ===
Each year municipalities submit a Training Needs Assessment where they request courses, training or professional development specific to their community. Therefore, the MTO offers a plethora of Targeted Training courses from Inuktitut-As-A-Second Language training, to road dust suppression training, to Zamboni operations, to Bronze Medallion courses for lifeguard training, to Class 3/Airbrakes, to Heavy Equipment Operator Training. All courses incorporate a cultural component to ensure relevance with the students being instructed.

== Partnerships ==
The MTO receives core funding through the Government of Nunavut's Department of Community & Government Services. However, the legal status of the school allows private partnerships that will further the MTO's mandate. In the past, the MTO has partnered with the following organizations, departments, agencies or associations to offer additional training opportunities for Inuit:

- Government of Nunavut Departments of:
  - Economic Development & Transportation
  - Health
  - Justice
  - Education
  - Culture & Heritage
  - Environment
- Canadian Northern Economic Development Agency (CanNor)
- Indigenous and Northern Affairs Canada (INAC)
- Nunavut Tunngavik Inc (NTI)
- Qikiqtani Inuit Association (QIA)
- Kitikmeot Inuit Association (KIA)
