= Environmental anthropology =

Sub-discipline of anthropology

Environmental anthropology is a sub-discipline of anthropology that examines the complex relationships between humans and the environments which they inhabit. This takes many shapes and forms, whether it be examining the hunting/gathering patterns of humans tens of thousands of years ago, archaeological investigations of early agriculturalists and their impact on deforestation or soil erosion, or how modern human societies are adapting to climate change and other anthropogenic environmental issues. This sub-field of anthropology developed in the 1960s from cultural ecology as anthropologists borrowed methods and terminology from growing developments in ecology and applied them to understand human cultures.

Environmental anthropology is a growing sub-field of anthropology because the challenges of understanding and addressing human caused environmental problems like climate change, species extinctions, plastic pollution, and habitat destruction require an understanding of the complex cultural, political, and economic systems that have created these problems.

== Historical development ==
The establishment of environmental anthropology can be credited to Julian Steward, a cultural ecologist who studied how the Shosone of the Great Basin between the Sierra Nevada and Rocky mountains adapted their environment. His efforts to define culture were based upon topography, climate, and resources and their accessibility. Other important early cultural ecologists were Roy Rappaport and Marvin Harris. Their work used systems theories to explain how societies worked to maintain homeostasis through feedback loops. Harris' work in India, for example, examined the sacred cow in India as an ecological adaptation because of its importance for milk production, dung for fuel and fertilizers, and labor for plowing. These approaches has since been since criticized for narrowly assuming the state of societies as static and not exploring the ways cultures change and develop over time.

Another important field that contributed to the creation of environmental anthropology was ethnoecology. Ethnoecologists like Harold Conklin, Darrell Posey, and Wade Davis looked at traditional ecological knowledge to understand how indigenous groups around the world managed the ecosystems in which they lived. Research in ethnobotany also led to the development of new drugs based on plants used in traditional herbal medicine.

Political ecology, an interdisciplinary social scientific perspective on environment issues, is also a significant contributor to environmental anthropology. Political ecology explores the ways that scientific and managerial approaches to the environment can often mask unequal relationships of power, especially in post-colonial settings. For example, the expansion of protected areas can be seen as an extension of state power into rural areas, rather than simply a plan to preserve wildlife.

== Current research ==
=== Climate change ===
There has been a renewed interest in recent years to reexamine cultural-environmental relationships across the globe due to the looming threats of land development, biodiversity loss, and water scarcity, all of which are, in large part, due to climate change.

While sociological research on climate change is emerging and ongoing, there is a global push to recognize global communities in the context of their ecologies, as well as their places in history. After all, throughout history, the natural climate of specific areas have allowed for certain nations to flourish, whether it be in the Fertile Crescent or in the Indus River Valley thousands of years ago.

=== Cultural diversity ===
There is a renewed focus of environmental anthropology on cultural variation and diversity. Such factors like environmental disasters (floods, earthquakes, frost), migrations, cost & benefit ratio, contact/ associations, external ideas (trade/ latent capitalism boom), along with internal, independent logic and inter-connectivity's impact now were observed. Roy A. Rappaport and Hawkes, Hill, and O'Connell's use of Pyke's optimal foraging theory for the latter's work are some examples of this new focus.

This perspective was based on general equilibriums and criticized for not addressing the variety of responses an organism can have, such as "loyalty, solidarity, friendliness, and sanctity" and possible "incentives or inhibitors" in relations to behavior. Rappaport, often referred to as a reductionist in his cultural studies methods, acknowledges, "The social unit is not always well defined" exhibiting another flaw in this perspective, obfuscation of aspects of analyze and designated terms.

== List of academic programs in environmental anthropology ==
- Portland State University. Undergraduate and Master's Program in Anthropology
- Utrecht University. M.Sc. Cultural Anthropology: Sustainable Citizenship
- Stanford University. Environmental Anthropology Cluster
- University of South Florida. Department of Anthropology Undergraduate and Graduate Programs in Applied Anthropology
- University College London. M.Sc. Anthropology, Environment, and Development
- University of California, Davis. Graduate Area of Specialization: Environmental Anthropology
- University of Georgia. Ecological and Environmental Anthropology. PhD. Integrative Conservation (ICON) Program. Undergraduate Certificates in Sustainability, Environmental Ethics, and Conservation Ecology.
- University of Kent. M.A. in Social Anthropology: Humanitarian and Environmental Crises
- "Environmental Anthropology". University of Pennsylvania.
- University of Maine. B.A. Anthropology: Human Dimensions of Climate Change. M.A. in Anthropology and Environmental Policy Program
- Australian National University. M.A. in Anthropology and Planetary Futures.
- University of Maryland. Ecological and Environmental Anthropology. B.A., B.S., MA.A., and Ph.D. programs
- University of Texas at San Antonio. Ph.D. in Environmental Anthropology
- Yale School of Forestry and Environmental Sciences and Department of Anthropology. Joint Doctoral Degree Program in Anthropology and the Environment
- Southern New Hampshire University Undergraduate degree - Concentration on Environmental Sustainability

== See also ==
- Environmental archaeology
- Cultural geography
- Ecological anthropology
- Environmental geography
- Science and technology studies
- Environmental justice
- Ethnoecology
- Ethnoornithology
- Political ecology
