= Maring Naga =

Maring Naga may refer to:

- Maring Naga people, a people of Manipur, India
- Maring Naga language, their Sino-Tibetan language

== See also ==
- Maring (disambiguation)
