= Inuit Qaujimajatuqangit =

Traditional knowledge of the Inuit

Inuit Qaujimajatuqangit (/inuit qaujimajatuqaŋit/, Inuktitut syllabics: ᐃᓄᐃᑦ ᖃᐅᔨᒪᔭᑐᖃᖏᑦ; sometimes Inuit Qaujimanituqangit – ᐃᓄᐃᑦ ᖃᐅᔨᒪᓂᑐᖃᖏᑦ) is an Inuktitut phrase that is often translated as "Inuit traditional knowledge", "Inuit traditional institutions" or even "Inuit traditional technology". It can also be abbreviated as "IQ". It comes from the verb root "qaujima-" meaning "to know" and can be literally translated to "that which has long been known by Inuit".

== Traditional knowledge ==
Inuit Qaujimajatuqangit is a body of knowledge and unique cultural insights of Inuit into the workings of nature, humans and animals. Inuit Qaujimajatuqangit, then, has both practical and epistemological aspects that branch out from a fundamental principle that human beings are learning, rational beings with an infinite potential for problem-solving within the dictates of nature and technology. According to the Government of Nunavut's 2013 document entitled Incorporating Inuit Societal Values, Inuit Qaujimajatuqangit has the following components:

- Inuuqatigiitsiarniq (respecting others, relationships and caring for people)
- Tunnganarniq (fostering good spirit by being open, welcoming and inclusive)
- Pijitsirniq (serving and providing for family, community, or both)
- Aajiiqatigiinniq (decision making through discussion and consensus)
- Pilimmaksarniq or Pijariuqsarniq (development of skills through practice, effort, and action)
- Piliriqatigiinniq or Ikajuqtigiinniq (working together for a common cause)
- Qanuqtuurniq (being innovative and resourceful)
- Avatittinnik Kamatsiarniq (respect and care for the land, animals and the environment)

The Inuit Language Protection Act of 2008 establishes the right for parents to have their children receive an education in Inuktitut. Inuit intergenerational (from Elder to youth) and experiential (learning through participation) knowledge has also been called "Inuit ecological knowledge" (IEK), "Traditional Ecological Knowledge" (TEK) or "Local Ecological Knowledge" (LEK).

=== Studies of traditional knowledge ===
The Igloolik Research Centre in Igloolik, Nunavut focuses on documenting Inuit Qaujimajatuqangit, as well as climatology and seismic data research. In 1999, Nunavut Arctic College began publishing Qaujimajatuqangit oral history through the Interviewing Inuit Elders book series, which covers Elders' perspectives on a wide range of topics from law and health to cosmology, dream interpretation, and shamanism.

== Politics ==
Since the early 21st century, Qaujimajatuqangit has become something of a political slogan in Nunavut, as the government attempts to integrate the traditional culture of the Inuit more into their modern governance structure in order to combat disempowerment caused by colonialism. Much of this integration involves citing oral history, including generational history, through interviews with Elders. While Royal Canadian Mounted Police officers and non-Inuk critics have dismissed oral history as unreliable and less concrete than statistics, Nunavut's government has been known to consult with Elders on matters of culture and environmental knowledge. IQ has also gained popularity in Canada's further-south provinces, but has yet to reach a similar level of prominence.

== In academia ==
Qaujimajatuqangit has been increasingly incorporated into Canadian academic settings in the 21st century. Marine biologist Enooyaq Sudlovenick uses Qaujimajatuqangit to study the health of marine arctic animals including beluga and ringed seals. In 2021, Polar Biology journal published the results of a study that used IEK (through interviewing Inuit Elders and hunters) to track the change in location of Atlantic walruses in the face of climate change. For this study, 32 Inuk Elders and walrus hunters (and one non-Inuk hunter) from Nunavik were interviewed to give their observations on whether or not the location of local Nunavik and Nunavut walruses had changed, either because of hunting or temperature increases. Interviewees were selected based on their advanced knowledge of walrus hunting and recognition by their local Hunters, Fishers and Trappers Associations.

== See also ==
- Traditional ecological knowledge
