= Enooyaq Sudlovenick =

Canadian Inuit marine biologist

- Born: 1992 (age 33–34); Iqaluit
- Education: University of Guelph (BS), University of Prince Edward Island (MS), and University of Manitoba (PhD, current)
- Occupations: Marine mammal health in the Arctic, pathology, and Inuit Qaujimajatuqangit research
- Awards: Weston Family Foundation Award in Northern Research, a prestigious award, presented to scientists at the cutting edge of Arctic research.
- Website: https://www.enooyaqsudlovenick.com/

Enooyaq Sudlovenick (born c. 1992) is an Inuk Canadian marine biologist. She was a recipient of the 2021 Weston Family Awards in Northern Research for her research into the health of marine animals of the Arctic.

== Early life ==
Sudlovenick was born in Iqaluit c. 1992. Her great-grandfather on her mother's side was a German whaler while her other maternal ancestors were North Baffin Inuit in an area ranging from modern-day Pond Inlet to Somerset Island and as far as Taloyoak on the mainland. Her father's ancestors were Inuit from Inukjuaq in Nunavik.

She grew up in Iqaluit and Pond Inlet on Baffin Island, and as a child ventured with her parents into the waters of Nunavut to examine marine life including sea angels, northern krill, and eels.

== Education ==
Sudlovenick worked at a summer student job with the Canadian Wildlife Service on Prince Leopold Island, and was inspired by a pod of narwhals to pursue marine ecology over terrestrial ecology.

Sudlovenick earned a Bachelor of Science in marine and freshwater biology from the University of Guelph. She then earned a Masters of Science in veterinary medicine, pathology and microbiology at the University of Prince Edward Island before returning to Iqaluit. Her thesis was on health in ringed seals collected by Inuit hunters for food, looking for the presence of antibodies of five parasites: trichinella, brucella, leptospira, erysipelas and toxoplasma. She also studied Arctic char and beluga whales.

As of 2021, Sudlovenick has been working on a PhD at the University of Manitoba, and is the president of the ArcticNet Student Association.

== Research ==
Sudlovenick studies marine ecology in the Beaufort Sea, part of the Inuvialuit Settlement Region, and the western Hudson Bay. She uses Western scientific methods including serology and study of contaminants alongside Inuit Qaujimajatuqangit concerning aspects such as whale taste, birth and migration rates, and other traditional knowledge. She has described using both approaches as "just mak[ing] for a better project overall." She has also written about her experiences being an Indigenous scientist. She has been cited in Canadian news outlets including CBC News on topics including Arctic marine animals and climate change detection. She is a member of the Canadian Climate Institute.

== Awards ==
Sudlovenick was a recipient of the 2021 Weston Family Awards in Northern Research, a prestigious award, presented by the Weston Family Foundation, for scientists at the cutting edge of Arctic research.
