= Ethnoecology =

Study of ecology across cultures

Ethnoecology is the scientific study of how different groups of people living in different locations understand the ecosystems around them, and their relationships with surrounding environments.

It seeks valid, reliable understanding of how we as humans have interacted with the environment and how these intricate relationships have been sustained over time.

The "ethno" (see ethnology) prefix in ethnoecology indicates a localized study of a people, and in conjunction with ecology, signifies people's understanding and experience of environments around them. Ecology is the study of the interactions between living organisms and their environment; enthnoecology applies a human focused approach to this subject. The development of the field lies in applying indigenous knowledge of botany and placing it in a global context.

== History ==
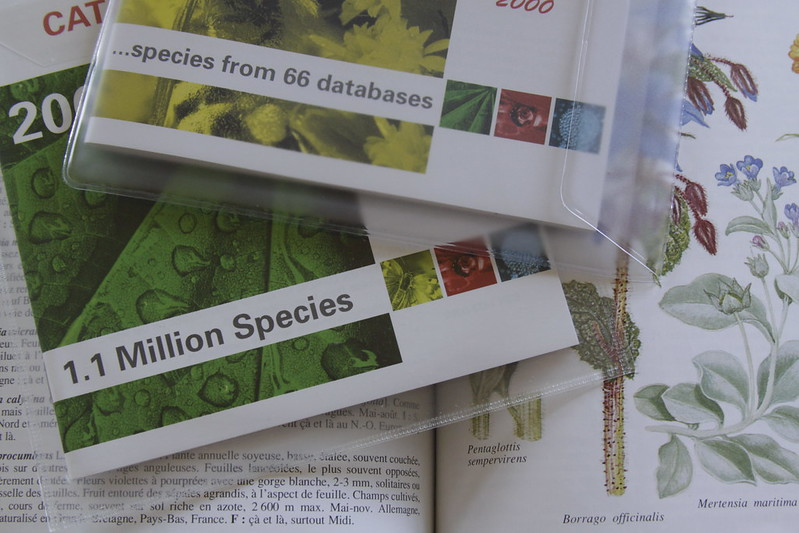
This image depicts a set of books on binomial classification, an important Western scientific taxonomic method. An important part of ethnoecology is comparing and contrasting local naming systems (folk taxonomies) with scientific taxonomies to gain a deeper understanding of local cultures.

Ethnoecology began with some of the early works of Dr. Hugh Popenoe, an agronomist and tropical soil scientist who has worked with the University of Florida, the National Science Foundation, and the National Research Council. Popenoe has also worked with Dr Harold Conklin, a cognitive anthropologist who did extensive linguistic and ethnoecological research in Southeast Asia.

In his 1954 dissertation "The Relation of the Hanunoo Culture to the Plant World", Harold Conklin coined the term ethnoecology when he described his approach as "ethnoecological". After earning his PhD, he began teaching at Columbia University while continuing his research among the Hanunoo.

In 1955, Conklin published one of his first ethnoecological studies. His "Hanunoo Color Categories" study helped scholars understand the relationship between classification systems and conceptualization of the world within cultures. In this experiment, Conklin discovered that people in various cultures recognize colors differently due to their unique classification system. Within his results he found that the Hanunoo uses two levels of colors. The first level consists of four basic terms of colors:; darkness, lightness, redness, and greenness. While, the second level was more abstract and consisted of hundreds of color classifications such as: texture, shininess, and moisture of objects also were used to classify objects.

Other anthropologists had a hard time understanding this color classification system because they often applied their own idea of color criteria to those of the Hanunoo. Conklin's studies were not only the breakthrough of ethnoecology, but they also helped develop the idea that other cultures conceptualize the world in their own terms, which helped to reduce ethnocentric views of those in western cultures. Other scholars such as Berlin, Breedlove, and Raven endeavored to learn more about other systems of environment classifications and to compare them to Western scientific taxonomies.

== Principles ==
Ethnoscience emphasizes the importance of how societies make sense of their own reality. In order to understand how cultures perceive the world around them, like the classification and organization of the environment, ethnoecology borrows methods from linguistics and cultural anthropology. Ethnoecology is a major part of an anthropologist's toolkit; it helps researchers understand how the society conceptualizes their surrounding environment i and that it can determine what the society considers "worth attending to" in their ecological system. This information can ultimately be useful for other approaches used in environmental anthropology.

Ethnoecology is a field of environmental anthropology, and has derived much of its characteristics from classic as well as more modern theorists. Franz Boas was one of the first anthropologists to question unilineal evolution, the belief that all societies follow the same, unavoidable path towards Western civilization. Boas strongly urged anthropologists to gather detailed ethnographic data from an emic standpoint in order to understand different cultures. Julian Steward was another anthropologist whose ideas and theories influenced the use of ethnoecology. Steward coined the term cultural ecology, the study of human adaptations to social and physical environments, and focused on how evolutionary paths in similar societies result in different trajectories instead of the classic global trends in evolution. This new perspective on cultural evolution was later named multilineal evolution. Both Boas and Steward believed that a researcher must use an emic standpoint and that cultural adaptation to an environment is not the same for each society. Furthermore, Steward's cultural ecology provides an important theoretical antecedent for ethnoecology. Another contributor to the framework of ethnoecology was anthropologist Leslie White. White emphasized the interpretation of cultures as systems and laid the foundations for interpreting the intersection of cultural systems with ecosystems as well as their integration into a coherent whole. Altogether, these anthropologists, established the foundations of ethnoecology we see today.

== Traditional ecological knowledge ==
Traditional Ecological Knowledge (TEK), also known as Indigenous Knowledge, "refers to the evolving knowledge acquired by indigenous and local peoples over hundreds or thousands of years through direct contact with the environment." It involves the accumulated knowledge, beliefs, and practices widely held by a specific community through their relationship with the environment. In this context, TEK consists of a community's shared ideas when considering subjects such as the acceptable uses of plants and animals, the best approach to maximizing the potential uses of land, the social institutions in which members of society are expected to navigate, and holistically, their worldview.

The study of TEK frequently includes critiques of the theoretical division between cultural systems and ecosystems, interpreting humans as an integral part of the whole. Humans, for example, can represent a keystone species in a given ecosystem and can play critical roles in creating, maintaining, and sustaining it . They can contribute to processes such as pedogenesis, seed dispersal, and fluctuations in biodiversity. They can also modify and condition animal behavior in either wild or domesticated species.

Traditional Ecological Knowledge has traditionally focused on what Western science can learn from these communities and how closely their cultural knowledge mirrors scientific structures. It has been argued that this previous understanding of ecological adaptation could have major influences on our ecological actions in the future.

== Local knowledge in western society ==
Within the discipline of ethnoecology, there is a clear emphasis on those societies that are deemed "indigenous", "traditional", or "savage", a common trend in anthropological pursuits through the 20th century. However, societies exist within a wide range of biomes, and have needs to know and understand clear and present dangers beyond those of harmful plants or how to get the best crop. Cruikshank contends that this may because many see Traditional Ecological Knowledge as a "static, timeless, and hermetically sealed" notion. Locked within time and space, there is no opportunity to innovate, and is therefore not found within the very new structures of a post-industrial society, such as that of the United States.

In this way, ethnoecologies may exist without the bounded notion of the other. For example, social scientists have attempted to understand the markers inner-city youth use to identify a threat to their livelihood, including the wearing of gang colors, tattoos, or protrusions through clothes that may represent or be a weapon. Likewise, concepts are spread about the health and needs of the community as they are related to the area around them. Instilled with recognizing dangers at an early age, and who these threats come from, a set of beliefs are held by the members of the society on how to live in their country, city, or neighborhood. This broadening of the discipline (bordering on human ecology) is important because it identifies the environment as not just the plants and animals, but also the humans and technologies a group of people have access to.

Similarly, social scientists have begun to use ethnoecological surveys in ethnographic studies in attempts to understand and address topics relevant in Western society as well as prevalent around the world. This includes researching the ways in which people view their choices and abilities in manipulating the world around them, especially in their ability to subsist.

== Traditional medicine ==
Traditional societies often treat medical issues through the utilization of their local environment. For example, in Chinese herbal medicine people consider how to utilize native plants for healing.

Almost 80% of the world's population utilizes ethnobotanical methods as a main source of treatment for illnesses, according to WHO. In the face of modern climate change, many traditional medicinal practices have been promoted for their environmental sustainability, such as Ayurveda from India.

== Epistemological concerns ==
According to Dove and Carpenter, "environmental anthropology sits astride the dichotomy between nature and culture, a conceptual separation between categories of nature, like wilderness and parks, and those of culture, like farms and cities.". It is inherent in this ideology that humans are a polluting factor violating a previously pristine locale.

This is especially relevant due to the role in which scientists have long understood how humans have worked for and against their environmental surroundings as a whole. In this way, the idea of a corresponding, but not adversarial, relationship between society and culture was once in itself baffling and defiant to the generally accepted modes of understanding in the earlier half of the twentieth century. As time went on, the understood dichotomy of nature and culture continued to be challenged by ethnographers such as Darrell A. Posey, John Eddins, Peter Macbeth and Debbie Myers. Also present in the recognition of indigenous knowledge in the intersection of Western science is the way in which it is incorporated, if at all. Dove and Carpenter contend that some anthropologists have sought to reconcile the two through a "translation", bringing the ethnological understandings and framing them in a modern dialogue.

In opposition to this paradigm is an attribution to the linguistic and ideological distinctiveness found in the nomenclature and epistemologies. This alone has created a subfield, mostly in recognition of the philosophies in ethnotaxonomy. To define ethnotaxonomy as new or different though, is inaccurate. It is simply placing a different understanding of a long-held tradition in ethnology, discovering the terms in which different peoples use to describe their world and worldviews. Those who seek to use and understand this knowledge have actively worked to both enfranchise and disenfranchise the societies in which the information was held. Haenn has noted that in several instances of working with conservationists and developers, there was a concerted effort to change the ideas of environment and ecology held by the native groups to the land, while plundering any and all texts and information on the resources found there, therefore enabling a resettlement of the land and redistribution of the knowledge, favoring the outsiders.

== See also ==
- Agroecology
- Environmental racism
- Human ecology
- Political ecology
