= Tsembaga Maring tribe =

Tsembaga Maring are a horticulturist people who live in the highlands of New Guinea. They have been extensively studied by ethnographers, the foremost of which is Roy Rappaport.

== Background ==
The study done in the Maring community of Papua New Guinea by Roy A. Rappaport during 1962 and 1963 is a good illustration of the bush fallow system of subsistence farming.

== Ethnographies ==
Rappaport conducted research on the Maring in the 1960s, publishing his work in a book entitled Pigs for the Ancestors.

== Lifestyle ==
The Maring are known for a special pattern of farming, hoarding of pigs, and warfare. Warfare usually proceeds after a ritual pig feast, known as kaiko.
