= Ecological anthropology =

Study of cultural adaptations to environments

Ecological anthropology is a sub-field of anthropology and is defined as the "study of cultural adaptations to environments". The sub-field is also defined as, "the study of relationships between a population of humans and their biophysical environment". The focus of its research concerns "how cultural beliefs and practices helped human populations adapt to their environments, and how people used elements of their culture to maintain their ecosystems". Ecological anthropology developed from the approach of cultural ecology, and it provided a conceptual framework more suitable for scientific inquiry than the cultural ecology approach. Research pursued under this approach aims to study a wide range of human responses to environmental problems.

Ecological anthropologist, Conrad Kottak published arguing there is an original older 'functionalist', apolitical style ecological anthropology and, as of the time of writing in 1999, a 'new ecological anthropology' was emerging and being recommended consisting of a more complex intersecting global, national, regional and local systems style or approach.

== History of the domain and leading researchers ==
In the 1960s, ecological anthropology first appeared as a response to cultural ecology, a sub-field of anthropology led by Julian Steward. Steward focused on studying different modes of subsistence as methods of energy transfer and then analyzed how they determine other aspects of culture. Culture became the unit of analysis. The first ecological anthropologists explored the idea that humans as ecological populations should be the unit of analysis, and culture became the means by which that population alters and adapts to the environment. It was characterised by systems theory, functionalism and negative feedback analysis.

Benjamin S. Orlove has noted that the development of ecological anthropology has occurred in stages. "Each stage is a reaction to the previous one rather than merely an addition to it". The first stage concerns the work of Julian Steward and Leslie White, the second stage is titled 'neofunctionalism' and/or 'neoevolutionism', and the third stage is termed 'processual ecological anthropology'. During the first stage, two different models were developed by both White and Steward. "The distinction is not as rigid as some critics have made it out to be, White's models of cultural evolution were unilinear and monocausal, whereas Steward admitted a number of different lines of cultural development and a number of different causal factors.

During the second stage, it was noted that the later group agreed with Steward and White, while the other disagreed. 'Neoevolutionists' borrowed from the work of Charles Darwin. The general approach suggested that "evolution is progressive and leads towards new and better forms in succeeding periods". 'Neofunctionalists' "see the social organization and culture of specific populations as functional adaptations which permit the populations to exploit their environments successfully without exceeding their carrying capacity". 'Processual ecological anthropology' is noted to be new. Studies based on this approach "seek to overcome the split in the second stage of ecological anthropology between excessively short and long time scales". The approach more specifically, examines "shifts and changes in individual and group activities, and they focus on the mechanism by which behavior and external constraints influence each other".

One of the leading practitioners within this sub-field of anthropology was Roy Rappaport. He delivered many outstanding works on the relationship between culture and the natural environment in which it grows, especially concerning the role of ritual in the processual relationship between the two. He conducted the majority, if not all, of his fieldwork amongst a group known as the Maring, who inhabit an area in the highlands of Papua New Guinea.

Patricia K. Townsend's work highlights the difference between ecological anthropology and environmental anthropology. In her view, some anthropologists interchangeably use both terms. She states that "Ecological anthropology will refer to one particular type of research in environmental anthropology – field studies that describe a single ecosystem including a human population". Studies conducted under this sub-field "frequently deal with a small population of only a few hundred people such as a village or neighbourhood".

Cultural Ecology influenced several anthropologists, including L. P. Vidyarthi and his concept of the Nature-Man-Spirit (NMS) complex.

== Globalization effects on the discipline ==
Studies under the discipline are concerned with the ethnoecologies of indigenous populations. Due to various factors associated with globalization, indigenous ethnoecologies are facing increasing challenges such as, "migration, media, and commerce spread people, institutions, information, and technology". "In the face of national and international incentives to exploit and degrade, ethnological systems that once preserved local and regional environments increasingly are ineffective or irrelevant".

Threats also exist of "commercial logging, industrial pollution, and the imposition of external management systems" on their local ecosystems. These threats to indigenous ways of life are a familiar occurrence in the field of anthropology. Conrad Phillip Kottak states that "Today's ecological anthropology, aka environmental anthropology, attempts not only to understand but also to find solutions to environmental problems".

One of the disciplines' approaches for finding such solutions is contemplating which aspects of human nature lead to environmental degradations. Such aspects of human nature can include a desire for technological innovations, an aspiration for higher social status, and a preoccupied or biased inclination to social justice. Another approach to deal with the contemporary climate issue is applying a norm of traditional ecological knowledge. Long-term ecological knowledge of an indigenous group can provide valuable insight into adaptation strategies, community-based monitoring, and dynamics between culturally important species and humans.

== Criticisms ==
From the beginning various scholars criticised the discipline, saying it inherently was too focused on static equilibrium which ignored change, that it used circular reasoning, and that it oversimplified systems. One of the current criticisms is that, in its original form, ecological anthropology relies upon cultural relativism as the norm. However, in today's world, there are few cultures that are isolated enough to live in a true culturally relative state. Instead, cultures are being influenced and changed by media, governments, NGOs, businesses, etc. In response, the discipline has seen a shift towards applied ecological anthropology, political ecology and environmental anthropology.

== Universities with ecological anthropology programs ==
- Indiana University
- North Carolina State University
- Oregon State University
- Rutgers University
- Stanford University
- University of Arizona
- University of Florida
- University of Georgia
- University of Hawaii
- University of Kent
- University of London
- University of Maryland
- University of Texas at San Antonio
- University of Washington

== See also ==
- Agroecology
- Cultural ecology
- Environmental anthropology
- Environmental sociology
- Ethnoecology
- Human behavioural ecology
- Human ecology
- Medical anthropology
- Sociocultural system
- Systems theory in anthropology
