= Cultural system =

Interaction of different elements in culture

A cultural system is the interaction of different elements in culture. While a cultural system is very different from a social system, sometimes both systems together are referred to as the sociocultural system.

== Social theory ==
A major concern in the social sciences is the problem of order. One way that social order has been theorized is according to the degree of integration of cultural and social factors.

=== Action theory ===
Talcott Parsons, a major figure in sociology and the main originator of action theory in the early 20th century, based his sociological theory of action system around a general theory of society, which is codified within a cybernetic model featuring four functional imperatives: adaptation, goal-attainment, integration, and pattern maintenance. The hierarchy of systems is, from least to most encompassing system, respectively, behavioral organism, personality system, social system, and cultural system as well. Ritzer and Goodman (2004) summarize Parsons' view, "Parsons saw these action systems acting at different levels of analysis, starting with the behavioral organism and building to the cultural system. He saw these levels hierarchically, with each of the lower levels providing the impetus for the higher levels, with the higher levels controlling the lower levels." In an article, late in life, Parsons maintained that the term "functionalism" was an inappropriate characterization of his theory.

=== System and social integration ===
The British Sociologist David Lockwood argued for a contrast between social content and social transmission in his work on social structure and agency. Noting that social systems were distinct in structure and transmission. Lockwood's conceptual distinction influenced Jürgen Habermas' discussion in the classic Legitimation Crises, who made the now famous distinction between system integration and social integration of the lifeworld.

=== Cultural and socio-cultural integration ===
Margaret Archer (2004) in a revised edition of her classic work Culture and Agency, argues that the grand idea of a unified, integrated culture system, as advocated by early Anthropologists such as Bronisław Malinowski and later by Mary Douglas, is a myth. Archer reads this same myth through Pitirim Sorokin's influence and then Talcott Parsons' approach to cultural systems (2004:3). The myth of a unified, integrated cultural system was also advanced by Western Marxists such as by Antonio Gramsci through the theory of cultural hegemony through a dominant culture. Basic to these mistaken conceptions was the idea of culture as a community of meanings, which function independently in motivating social behavior. This combined two independent factors, community and meanings which can be investigated quasi-independently (2004:4)

Archer, a proponent of critical realism, suggests that cultural factors can be objectively studied for the degree of compatibility (and that various aspects of cultural systems may be found to contradict each other in meaning and use). And, social or community factors in socialization may be studied in the context of the transmission of cultural factors by studying the social uniformity (or lack thereof) in the transmitted culture. Cultural systems are used (and inform society) both through idea systems and the structuring of social systems. To quote Archer in this regard:

"logical consistency is a property of the world of ideas; causal consistency is a property of people. The main proposition here is the two are logically and empirically distinct and, hence can vary independently of one another. Thus it is perfectly conceivable that any social unit, from a community to a civilization, could be found the principle ideational elements (knowledge, belief, norms, language, mythology, etc.) of which do display considerable logical consistency – that is, the components are consistent, not contradictory – yet the same social unit may be low on causal consensus. " (2004:4)

Archer notes that the opposite may be the case: low cultural logical consistency and high social consistency. Complex societies can include complex sociocultural systems that mix of cultural and social factors with various levels of contradiction and consistency.

== Research ==
According to Burrowes (1996), in two recent approaches to the study of culture, in the 1980-1990s, the "cultural studies" and "cultural indicators" approaches, investigators explored the traditionally functionalist concern of "cultural systems integration." These two approaches could be synthesized in the investigating cultural systems. Burrowes (1996) writes, "If functionalism offers to this cross-fertilization a focus on the normative orders of society, the cultural indicators approach provides a rigorous methodology, and cultural studies caution a greater sensitivity to social hierarchies." Constrained by Merton's middle range theory [note: to be discussed here], the specification of cultural elements and social structures makes possible the investigation of specific cultural and social systems and their interaction.
