= Harold C. Conklin =

American anthropologist

- Born: Harold Colyer Conklin; April 27, 1926; Easton, Pennsylvania, U.S.
- Died: February 18, 2016 (aged 89)
- Occupation: Educator

Academic background
- Education: University of California, Berkeley; Yale University

Academic work
- Discipline: Anthropologist
- Institutions: Columbia University; Yale University
- Doctoral students: Alfred W. McCoy (1977)

Harold Colyer Conklin (April 27, 1926 – February 18, 2016) was an American anthropologist who conducted extensive ethnoecological and linguistic field research in Southeast Asia (particularly the Philippines) and was a pioneer of ethnoscience, documenting indigenous ways of understanding and knowing the world.

== Early life and education ==
Conklin was born in Easton, Pennsylvania in 1926 but moved before the age of one to his father's hometown of Patchogue, New York. Interested in Native American culture from an early age, he was adopted by the St. Regis Mohawk tribe of the Akwesasne (Mohawk) Nation in 1939, when he was in eighth grade. While in high school, he pursued his interest in anthropology by serving as a volunteer at the American Museum of Natural History under anthropology curator Clark Wissler.

Conklin entered the University of California, Berkeley as an undergraduate in 1943, studying with anthropologists Robert Lowie, Alfred L. Kroeber, and Edward W. Gifford, as well as geographer Carl O. Sauer. He attended Berkeley for one year before being inducted into the United States Army in July 1944. After serving briefly in New Guinea and Leyte, he served with the 158th Infantry Regiment on the island of Luzon in the Philippines.

When World War II came to an end, Conklin continued serving with the Army in the Philippines until his discharge in August 1946. With the support of the Berkeley anthropology department he remained in the Philippines to conduct fieldwork for a year and a half. In 1947, he traveled to Mindoro and Palawan for a linguistic and cultural survey, spending time with the Hanunóo, an upland tribe in Mindoro. In Manila, he met with the tropical botanist Harley Harris Bartlett, who instructed him in botanical research and provided him with funds to create an ethnobotanical collection from Palawan.

Conklin returned to Berkeley in 1948 and finished his undergraduate work in 1950. He then started graduate school in anthropology at Yale University. At Yale he studied with Floyd Lounsbury (who became his dissertation advisor), Bernard Bloch, and Isidore Dyen, among others. His fellow graduate students included William C. Sturtevant and Charles Frake, who shared his interest in language, culture, and cognition. He conducted fieldwork among the Hanunóo in Mindoro from 1952 to 1954, completing his dissertation in 1955.

== Career ==
In 1955, Conklin accepted a teaching position in anthropology at Columbia University. There he pursued his research interests in language, culture, cognition, kinship, and folk classification. He continued publishing his analysis of the Hanunóo until 1961, when he moved his research to Ifugao in northern Luzon, where he would make a series of fieldwork trips for the next two decades.

Conklin joined the faculty of the Department of Anthropology at Yale University in 1962. At Yale his research areas included the ethnology and ecology of tropical forested areas of the Pacific Basin. Based on his extensive research, Conklin built one of the largest ethnographic collections from the Philippines at Yale's Peabody Museum of Natural History, where he was Curator of Anthropology from 1974 until his retirement in 1996. Nearly 1,500 objects that he collected in the Philippines have been acquired by the American Museum of Natural History.

Conklin died on February 18, 2016, at the age of 89. Conklin's wife, Jean M. Conklin (married 1954) died in 2008. They are survived by their sons, Bruce R. Conklin of San Francisco, CA, and Mark W. Conklin of Park City UT.

== Publications ==
Some of Harold Conklin's publications include:

- (1955a) "Hanunóo Color Categories" Southwestern Journal of Anthropology, Vol. 11, No. 4. pg. 339–344
- (1955b) The Relation of Hanunoo Culture to the Plant World
- (1956) "Tagalog Speech Disguise" Language, Vol. 32, No. 1. pg. 136–139.
- (1957) Hanunoo Agriculture
- (1959a) "Facts and Comments. Ecological Interpretations and Plant Domestication" American Antiquity, Vol. 25, No. 2. pg. 260–262
- (1959b) "Linguistic Play in Its Cultural Context" Language, Vol. 35, No. 4. pg. 631–636.
- (1963) The Study of Shifting Cultivation. Washington: Technical Publications
- (1967) An Ethnoecological Approach to Shifting Agriculture
- (1980) Ethnographic Atlas of Ifugao: A Study of Environment, Culture, and Society in northern Luzon
- (1986) "Symbolism and Beyond. Hanunóo Color Categories" Journal of Anthropological Research, Vol. 42, No. 3, pg. 441–446.

== Online material ==
- Conklin, Harold. C (1949) "Bamboo Literacy on Mindoro" Pacific Discovery Vol 3. Pg 4-11 Accessed August 12, 2009
- Conklin, Harold. C (1957) "Hanunóo agriculture: An Example of Shifting Cultivation in the Philippines" Unasylva. Vol. 11, No. 4 Accessed August 12, 2009

== See also ==
- Contrast set
- Ethnobiology
