= Cannibalism in the Americas =

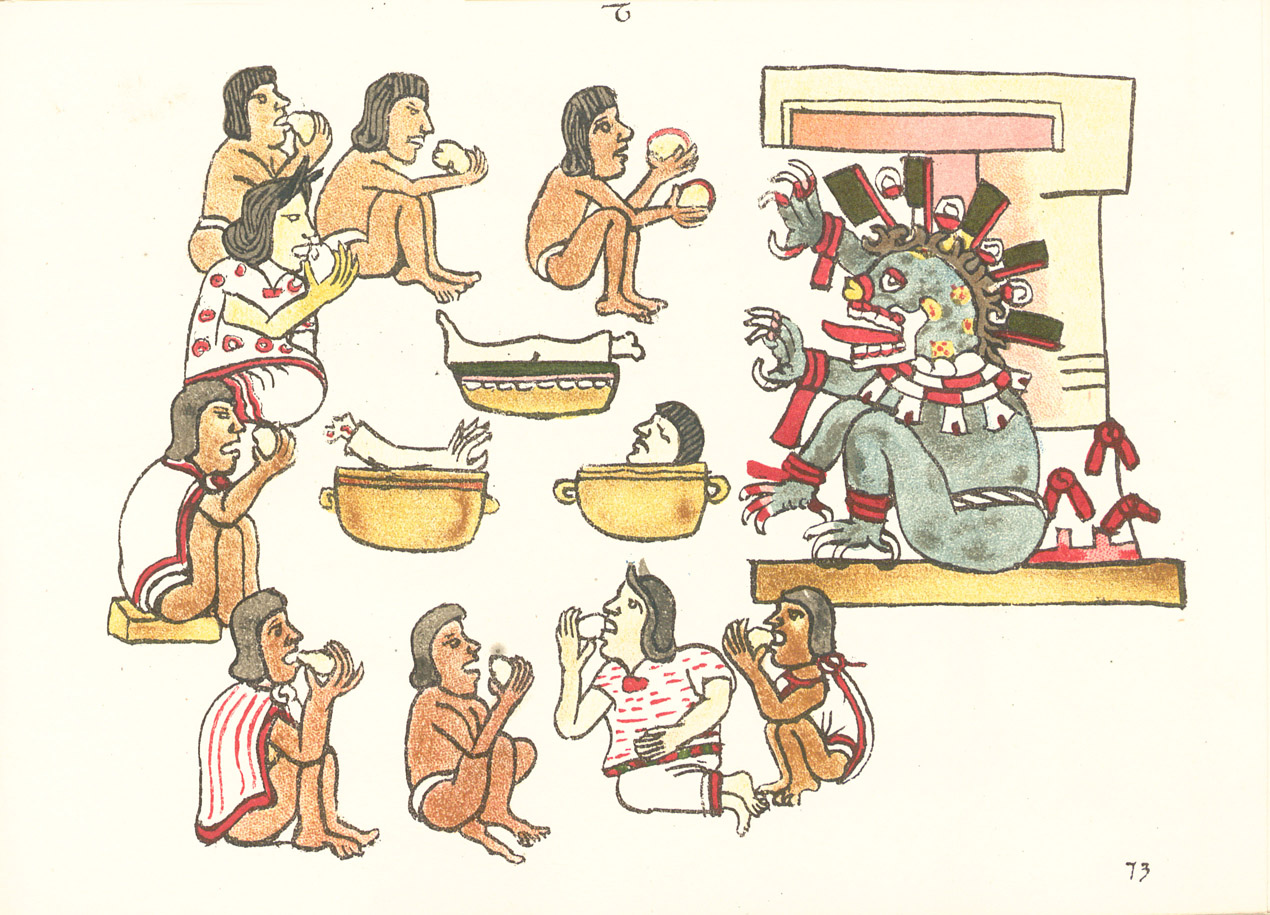
A scene depicting ritualistic Aztec cannibalism being practiced in the Codex Magliabechiano, folio 73r.

The history and scope of cannibalism in the Americas is complex, involving ritual or cultural practices connected with human sacrifice and warfare as well as instances motivated by famine and criminal cases. The modern term "cannibal" is derived from the name of the Island Caribs (Kalinago), who were encountered by Christopher Columbus in The Bahamas. While numerous cultures in the Americas were reported by European explorers and colonizers to have engaged in cannibalism, some of these claims may be unreliable since the Spanish Empire used them to justify conquest.

At least some cultures have been archeologically proven beyond any doubt to have undertaken institutionalized cannibalism. This includes human bones uncovered in a cave hamlet confirming accounts of the Xiximes undertaking ritualized raids as part of their agricultural cycle after every harvest. Also proven are the Aztec ritual ceremonies during the Spanish conquest at Tecoaque. The Anasazi in the 12th century have also been demonstrated to have undertaken cannibalism, possibly due to drought, as shown by proteins from human flesh found in recovered feces.

There is near universal agreement that some Mesoamericans practiced human sacrifice and cannibalism, but there is no scholarly consensus as to its extent. Anthropologist Marvin Harris, author of Cannibals and Kings, has suggested that the flesh of the victims was a part of an aristocratic diet as a reward since the Aztec diet was lacking in proteins. According to Harris, the Aztec economy would not support feeding enslaved people (the captured in war), and the columns of prisoners were "marching meat." Conversely, Bernard R. Ortiz de Montellano has proposed that Aztec cannibalism coincided with harvest times and should be considered more of a Thanksgiving. Montellano rejects the theories of Harner and Harris, saying that with evidence of so many tributes and intensive chinampa agriculture, the Aztecs did not need any other food sources. William Arens' 1979 book The Man-Eating Myth claimed that "there is no firm, substantiable evidence for the socially accepted practice of cannibalism anywhere in the world, at any time in history", but his views have been largely rejected as irreconcilable with the actual evidence.

In later times, cannibalism has occasionally been practiced as a last resort by people suffering from famine. Well-known examples include the ill-fated Donner Party (1846–1847) and the crash of Uruguayan Air Force Flight 571 (1972), after which the survivors ate the bodies of the dead. Additionally, there are cases of people engaging in cannibalism for sexual pleasure, such as Albert Fish and Jeffrey Dahmer. In the Amazon, some groups continue to practice forms of funerary cannibalism.

== South America ==
=== Brazil ===
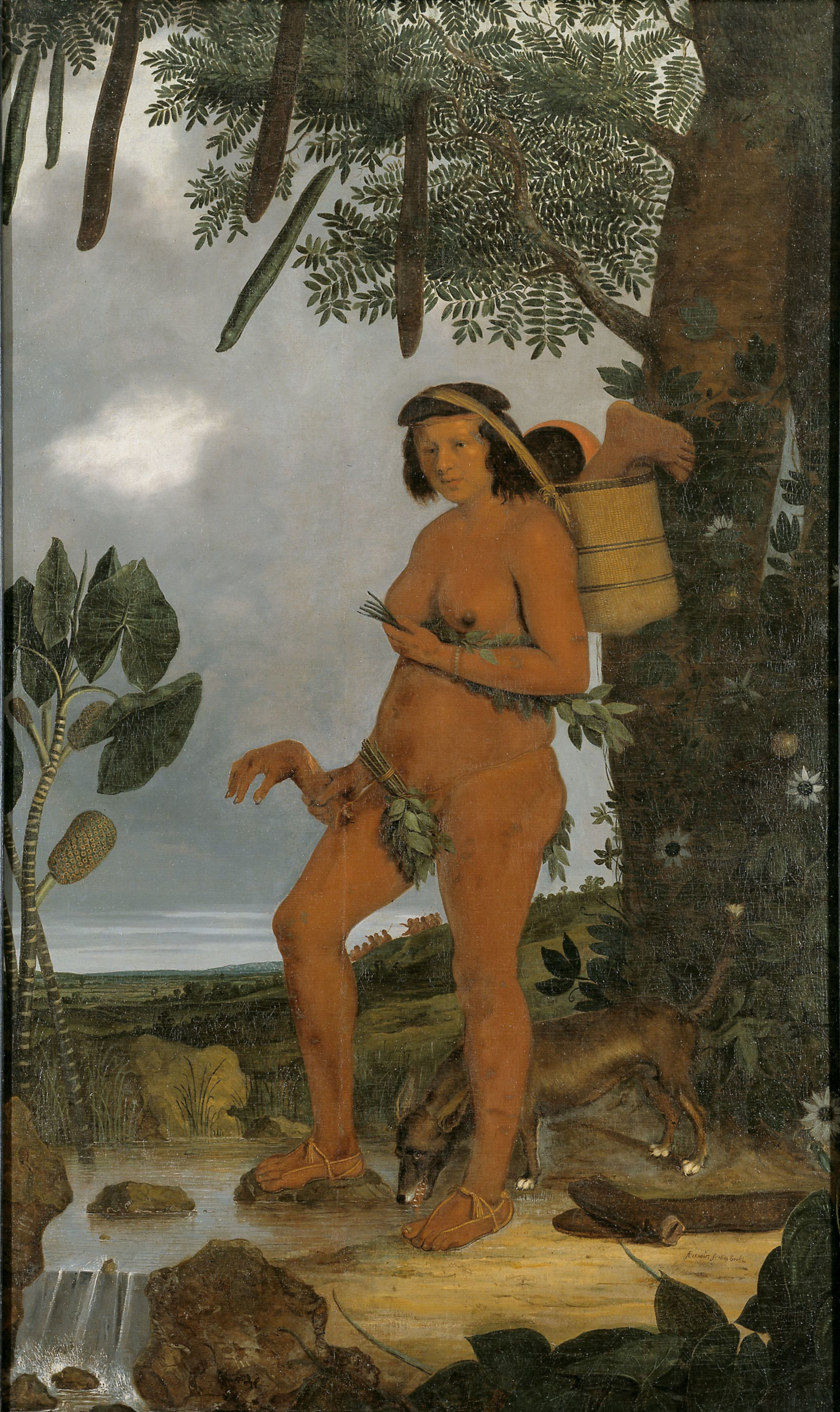
Tapuia woman holding a severed human hand and showing a human leg in her basket. By the Dutch painter Albert Eckhout, Brazil, 1641.

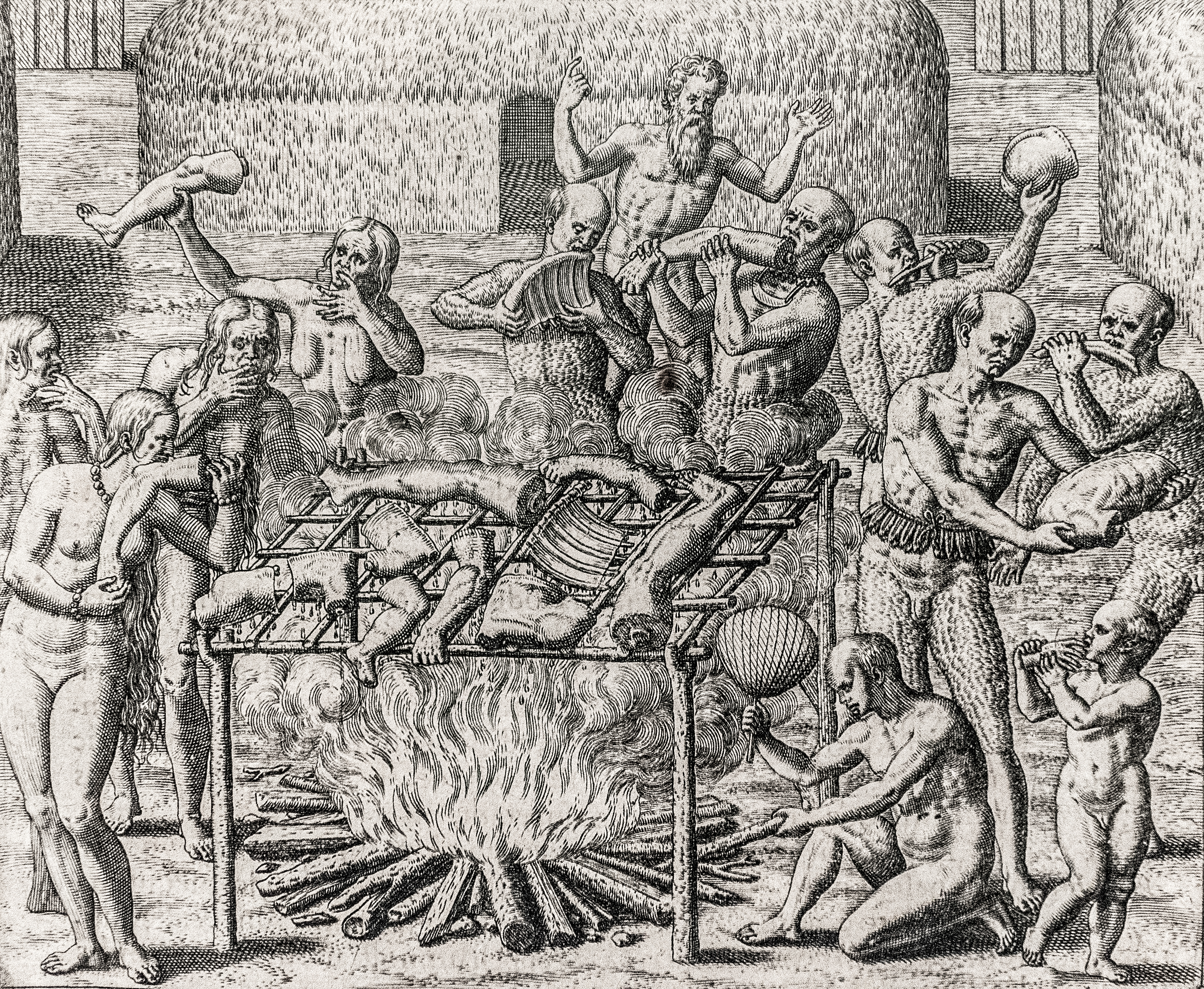
Cannibalism in Brazil. Engraving by Theodor de Bry for Hans Staden's account of his 1557 captivity.

In early Brazil, cannibalism is said to have been a common practice among the Tupinamba and various other Tupi, particularly against captured warriors. German explorer Hans Staden was captured by Tupinamba. According to his account, True History: An Account of Cannibal Captivity in Brazil, he would have been eaten had he not impressed the chief Cunhambebe. Anne B. McGinness states that the way different Christian missionaries reacted to cannibalism influenced the success or failure of their attempts to convert the Tupinamba to Christianity. Missionaries sometimes received threats of cannibalism, including from Tupinamba women, but some nevertheless continued their conversion efforts.

In 1556 the first bishop of Brazil, Pero Fernandes Sardinha, was shipwrecked in present-day Coruripe where the local Caetés captured and ate him. The Goitacá reportedly practiced cannibalism for a preference in taste instead of for spiritual or ritual reasons.

The Aimoré in Minas Gerais are recorded as practicing cannibalism during the 19th century, with reports stating they killed and consumed escaped slaves and soldiers in their territory. The accuracy of colonial reporting over their supposed cannibalism has been questioned. Prince Maximilian of Wied-Neuwied, who visited the region, doubted that they ate human flesh for its taste (like some administrators claimed), while accepting that they practiced ritual cannibalism.

Both exocannibalism and endocannibalism were practiced among Amazonian peoples into the 20th century. British explorer Thomas Whiffen wrote that cannibalism – almost exclusively exocannibalism – was extensively practiced in the upper Amazon during his 1908–1909 expedition to the region. The Wariʼ consumed the bodies of both deceased relatives and enemies killed in war until the 1960s, using deliberately divergent rituals depending on whether the eaten was a relative or an enemy. The Yanomami still practice cannibalism on deceased relatives, consuming their ashes in a funerary ceremony known as reahu. Their funerary cannibalism was partially interrupted by the COVID-19 pandemic, as the government insisted on burying those killed by the diseases.

There have been cannibalistic serial killers in Brazilian history, such as the Garanhuns cannibals who consumed the flesh of their victims and also sold it to unsuspecting buyers in 2012.

=== Peru ===
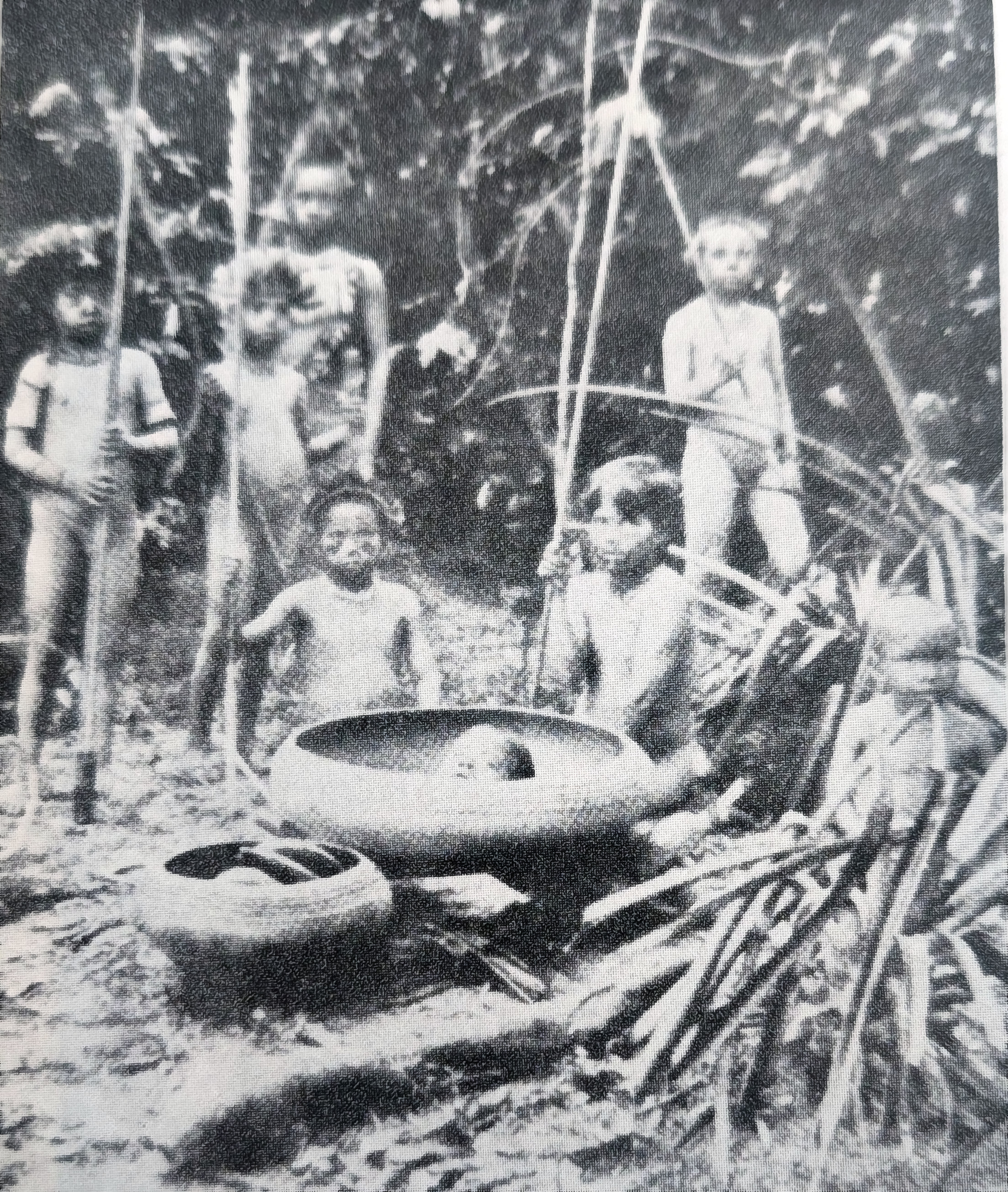
Young aborigines from the Putumayo area roasting and eating an enemy. Circa 1920.

Archeological examination of bones found at the Zana valley and dated to the Andean preceramic phase from around 6,500 to 3,000 B.C may show signs of cannibalism. Bones belonging to males were found in dense clusters and showing large amount of artificial breaking and cutmarks. Peruvian archeologist Luis Guillermo Lumbreras found other dislocated remains from the period and interpreted them as possible signs of cannibalism.

Evidence from the Huaca de la Luna indicates that ritual cannibalism was practiced in the Moche culture. Moche artwork shows scenes of blood consumption and the flaying of captives, and human bones found in a sacrificial plaza show traces of both practices.

American artist Tobias Schneebaum lived with the Harakmbut in the Peruvian Amazon in the mid-1950s. He participated in a raid where all the males of a rival tribe were killed and parts of them cooked and consumed; he left the Harakmbut following that incident.

=== Chile and Argentina ===
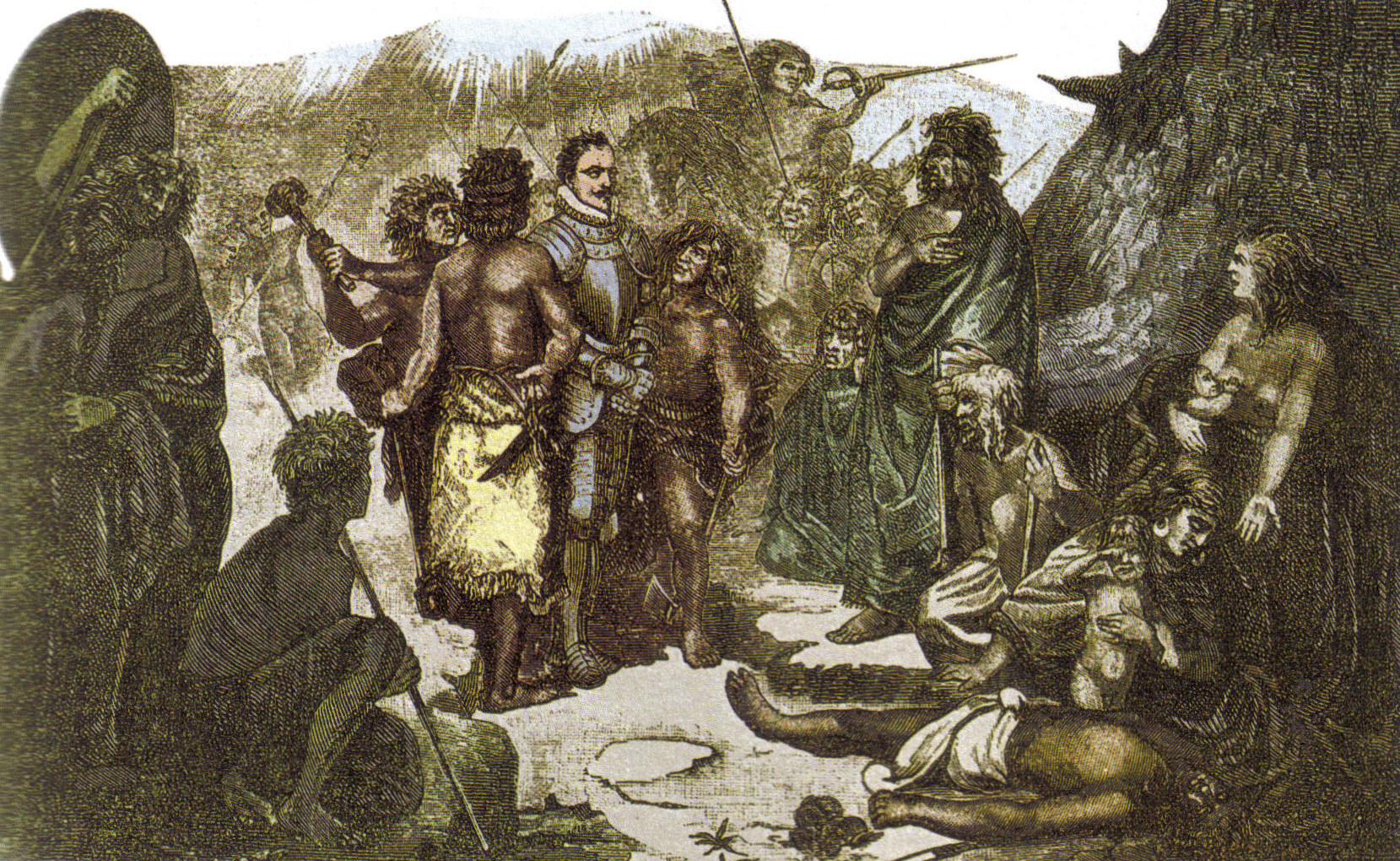
Pedro de Valdivia shortly before he was killed and partially consumed. Etching by Nicolás Guzmán Bustamante.

The Mapuche are generally accepted to have practiced cannibalism in certain circumstances. Pedro de Valdivia, the first Governor of Chile, was captured by them in 1553 during the Arauco War and had his heart cut out and eaten by several chiefs. Some accounts say that beforehand the Mapuche ripped out chunks from Valdivia's body while he was alive and consumed them as he watched. Toqui Caupolicán told García Hurtado de Mendoza that he had eaten Valdivia and threatened to do the same to him.

Robert Charles Padden has argued that institutionalized cannibalism emerged among the Mapuche only with the Spanish invasion, as a symbol of resistance and a weapon of psychological warfare. Sometimes even the bones of slain Spaniards were burned, powdered, and consumed in wine so that no memory of them would remain. Marcelo Ignacio González Gálvez instead argues that outsiders in general, not just Spaniards, were considered suitable for sacrifice, since the existing accounts of the killing and ritual consumption of Spaniards and of other Indigenous people do not differ substantially. He criticizes explanations that treat sacrifices of Spaniards as retaliation for colonial abuses as retrospective justifications based on multiculturalist worldviews, arguing that explanations should instead be grounded in Mapuche ontology.

The Fuegians were repeatedly described as cannibals from the 17th century onward. However, Anglican missionaries who lived among them denied this, and modern academics tend to agree with them. In 1624, Dutch sailors were attacked by the Yahgan and 12 were reportedly eaten. Ethnologist Anne Chapman wrote that the Dutch sailors may indeed have been eaten but that it was likely an isolated incident, as there is no other reliable evidence that the Yahgan practiced cannibalism. After the second voyage of HMS Beagle, both Robert FitzRoy and Charles Darwin wrote that, when facing starvation during hard winters, the Fuegians killed and consumed their old women, asphyxiating them with campfire smoke. They credited this information to a Chono boy named Bob, with Darwin adding that Jemmy Button had confirmed it. FitzRoy claimed that the bodies of all enemies killed in battle were eaten, citing Jemmy Button, York Minster, and Fuegia Basket as his sources.

Anglican missionary Thomas Bridges rejected these claims in 1888, stating that life was sacred to the Yahgan and that they did not consume human flesh even in the harshest famines. His son Lucas Bridges, who grew up among the Yahgan, confirmed that they were not cannibals and speculated that Jemmy Button and Darwin may have misunderstood each other. Chapman notes that Darwin elsewhere described Bob as a liar but apparently accepted his description of cannibalism without hesitation because it fit his expectations.

=== Survival cannibalism ===
==== 16th century ====
At times European explorers resorted to survival cannibalism when running out of other provisions. European members of a 1530 expedition led by Ambrosius Ehinger murdered and consumed at least three Indigenous people, among them a woman whom some Europeans had taken with them, "a friendly Pacabuey boy who was with the expedition", and one of a group of friendly Indigenous people who had promised to guide them. Body parts not eaten immediately were roasted and taken along as provisions.

A few years later, members of another expedition ate "vermin such as snakes" as well as horses and dogs. Several of them ate human meat, in one case "cooking a quarter of a child together with some greens". Philipp von Hutten, who participated in the expedition and reported this, commented: "It is horrible [to consider what] the poor Christians ate on that expedition".

==== 20th century ====
When Uruguayan Air Force Flight 571 crashed on a glacier in the Andes on October 13, 1972, the survivors resorted to eating the deceased during their 72 days in the mountains. Their experiences and memories became the source of several books and films. Survivor Roberto Canessa described how they "agonized" for days in the knowledge that "the bodies of our friends and team-mates, preserved outside in the snow and ice, contained vital, life-giving protein that could help us survive. But could we do it?" Ultimately he and the other 15 people who were rescued months later decided they could, realizing there was no other way to stave off starvation.

== Caribbean ==
=== Caribbean Sea in the 15th and 16th centuries ===
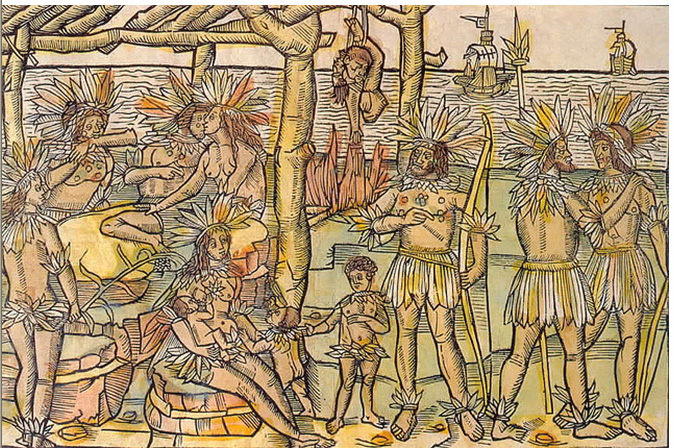
The first known depiction of cannibalism in the New World. Germany, c. 1505, People of the Islands Recently Discovered.... Woodcut by Johann Froschauer for an edition of Amerigo Vespucci's Mundus Novus.

European explorers and colonizers brought home many stories of cannibalism practiced by the native peoples they encountered. In Spain's overseas expansion to the New World, the practice of cannibalism was reported by Christopher Columbus in the Caribbean islands, attributed to the Island Caribs (Kalinago), who were greatly feared warriors. Queen Isabella I of Castile later forbade the Spaniards to enslave Indigenous people unless they were "Cannibals", which at that time was a variant of the word "Caribs".

Despite their fierce reputation, some writers of the first accounts of alleged Carib cannibalism did not condemn them for their acts, instead referring to the Kalinago in largely positive terms. While they are described as eaters as human flesh in a number of historical accounts, the credibility of these descriptions is debated. Archaeologist William Keegan concludes that the tales of cannibalism may have a factual basis, with enemies being eaten to "frighten" the survivors. On Marie-Galante, pre-Columbian bones showing cut marks, bite marks, and evidence of burning have been found, with cannibalism a possible explanation and some of the alterations consistent with descriptions from Columbus's time. Regardless of the historical truth behind them, accusation of cannibalism quickly became a pretext for attacks on Indigenous groups and justification for the Spanish conquest.

In Yucatán, a shipwrecked Spaniard Jerónimo de Aguilar, who later became a translator for Hernán Cortés, reported to have witnessed fellow Spaniards sacrificed and eaten but escaped from captivity where he was being fattened for sacrifice himself. The Florentine Codex (1576), compiled by Franciscan Bernardino de Sahagún from information provided by indigenous eyewitnesses, includes depictions of Mexica (Aztec) cannibalism. Franciscan friar Diego de Landa reported on further Yucatán instances.

=== Haiti in the 19th century ===
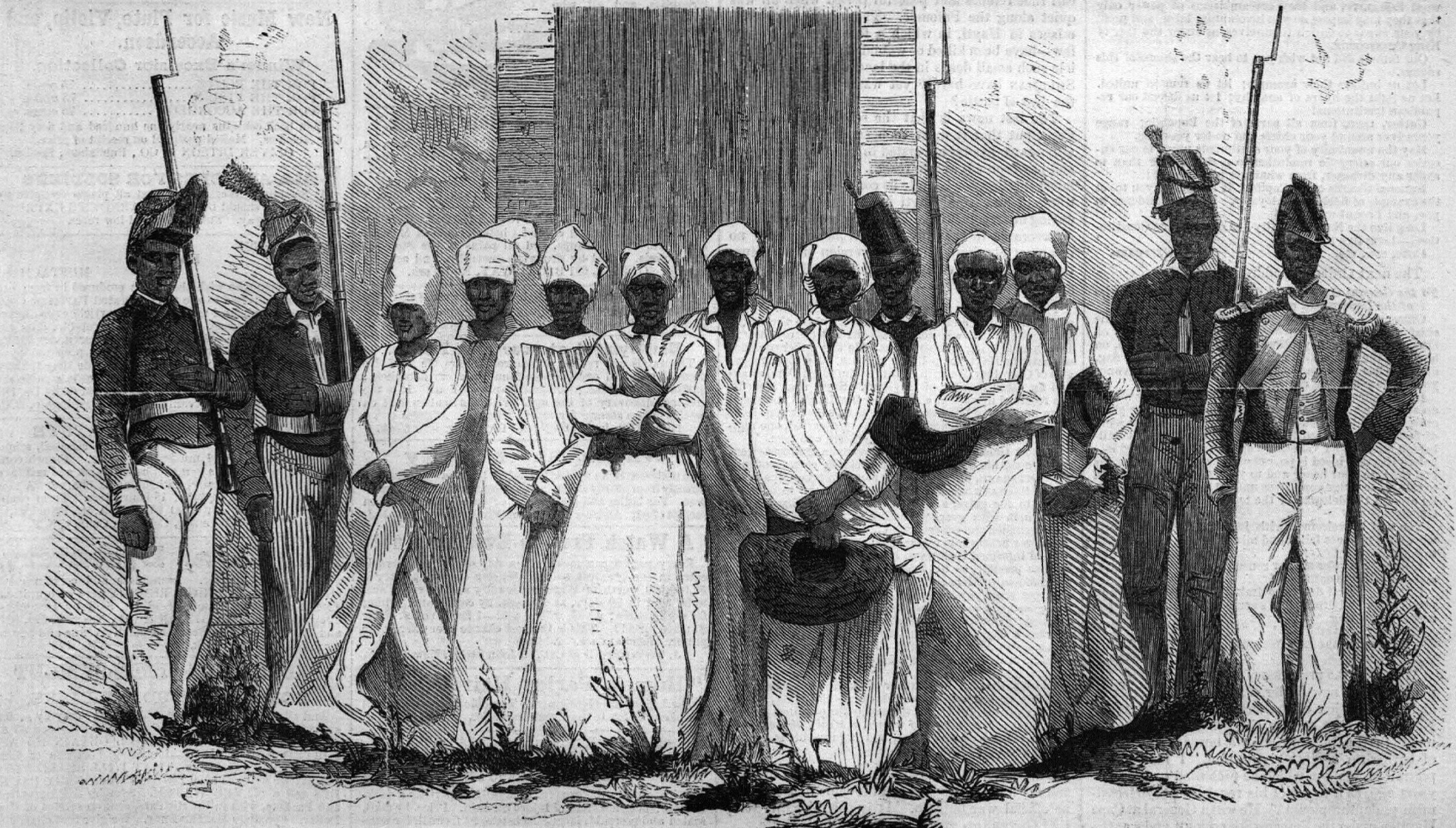
The eight persons found guilty of murdering and eating a girl in a Vodou ritual in Haiti, 1864

In February 1864, eight Haitians – four men and four women – were sentenced to death and executed for having murdered and cannibalized a girl in a Vodou ritual held in a village near Port-au-Prince. Accounts of the trial vary regarding the girl's age – reported to range from seven to twelve – but are otherwise largely in agreement. The niece of one of the men was kidnapped while her mother was away, and a few days later, "strangled, flayed, decapitated and dismembered" in a sacrificial ritual allegedly held to make her uncle wealthy. Her remains were then cooked and eaten, with some evidence indicating that more than the eight people found guilty might have eaten her flesh. There are two other accounts of cannibalistic Vodou ceremonies by self-claimed eyewitnesses from the 1870s and 1880s, but their reliability is disputed.

Various European visitors and inhabitants of the country thought that cannibalism was reasonably common and was practiced not only in the context of human sacrifices but also for gastronomic reasons. Sir Spenser St. John, the British chargé d'affaires in Haiti in the 1860s, collected many such accounts in a controversial book first published in 1884. While allowing that only a minority of Vodou worshippers engaged in or approved of human sacrifice, St. John recorded several cases where children were sacrificed and eaten in Vodou ceremonies, reported by people who said to have witnessed them in person. He also referred to records of a case where the police supposedly found "packages of salted human flesh", but for fear of causing a scandal, chose not to investigate further.

Not all reports of cannibalism collected by St. John related to religious ceremonies. A French merchant told him he had once seen a group of soldiers beating a man; when he inquired about the reason, they ordered the man "to open his basket, and there he saw the body of a child cut up into regular joints." St. John spoke with a woman who had seen how "human flesh was openly sold in the market" in the countryside, and other witnesses stated the same. There are also newspaper reports of quartered children sold as food in the Christmas season, of the remains of partially eaten children being found, and of a man who accidentally ate some of "the leg of a child served to him as part of his dinner."

St. John's Spanish colleague told him that many children disappeared during certain seasons without a trace; while nothing more was known with certainty, people generally assumed most of them had been eaten. Similarly, the British captain William Kennedy heard from an Anglican clergyman that children were "stolen, butchered, and their flesh sold" in markets throughout the country. The clergyman's wife had once nearly purchased a chunk of human flesh, "believing it to be pork". Kennedy also heard of a family feast where a little boy had been consumed and spoke with a man who had seen barrels filled with human flesh offered for sale in western Haiti.

Mike Dash notes that evidence for the claims made by St. John and other observers that cannibalism was "a normal feature" of Haitian life is nevertheless thin. While the custom does not seem to have been unknown or universally shunned, estimates made by some Europeans, according to which "forty Haitians were eaten" every day and "almost every citizen of the country had tasted human flesh", were presumably widely exaggerated, reflecting prejudices more than reality.

== Middle America ==
=== Aztecs ===
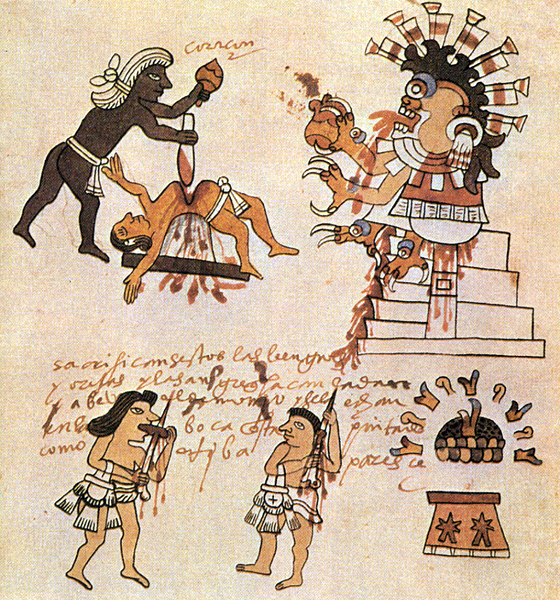
Aztecs sacrificing a victim and bleeding their tongue and ears

There is near-universal agreement that some Mesoamerican people practiced human sacrifice followed by cannibalism. Still, there is a lack of scholarly consensus on how widespread the latter practice was, with some scholars suggesting that it may not have occurred at all. At the other extreme, the anthropologist Marvin Harris, author of Cannibals and Kings, has suggested that the flesh of the victims was a part of an aristocratic diet as a reward since the Aztec diet was lacking in proteins. While most historians of the pre-Columbian era accept that there was ritual cannibalism related to human sacrifices, they often reject suggestions that human flesh could have been a significant portion of the Aztec diet. Cannibalism was also associated with acts of warfare, and has been interpreted as an element of blood revenge in war.

The Mexica of the Aztec period are perhaps the most widely studied of the ancient Mesoamerican peoples. While most pre-Columbian historians believe that ritual cannibalism took place in the context of human sacrifices, they do not support Harris' thesis that human flesh was ever a significant portion of the Aztec diet. Michael D. Coe states that while "it is incontrovertible that some of these victims ended up by being eaten ritually […], the practice was more like a form of communion than a cannibal feast".

Documentation of Aztec cannibalism mainly dates from the period after the Spanish conquest of the Aztec Empire (1519-1521). For instance, a convoy ordered by Diego Velázquez de Cuéllar was reportedly cannibalized by the Aztecs in Zultépec-Tecoaque in 1520. In the Nahuatl language, the name "Tecoaque" translates into "the place where they ate them." For eight months, the convoy was ritually sacrificed, and their heads were put up on skull racks known as tzompantli. Both men and women were sacrificed, including pregnant women. At least one 3-or-4-year-old child was also sacrificed during the ritual, and the town's population swelled to 5,000 as people arrived for the ceremonies. In 1521, Hernán Cortés and his forces arrived and, in an act of revenge, massacred the town's inhabitants, who were mostly women and children.

Conversely, in his widely criticized book, The Man-Eating Myth, Arens writes, "The gradual transformation of what little evidence is available for Aztec cannibalism is also an indication of the continual need to legitimize the Conquest". The following claims could have been exaggerated.

- Hernán Cortés wrote in one of his letters that a Spaniard saw an Indian ... eating a piece of flesh taken from the body of an Indian who had been killed.
- The Historia general (compiled 1540–1585) by Bernardino de Sahagún (the first Mesoamerican ethnographer, according to Miguel León-Portilla) contains an illustration of an Aztec being cooked by an unknown tribe. This was reported as one of the dangers that Aztec traders faced.
- In his book Relación (1582), Juan Bautista de Pomar (c. 1535 – 1590) states that after the sacrifice, the body of the victim was given to the warrior responsible for the capture. He would boil the body and cut it into pieces to be offered as gifts to important people in exchange for presents and slaves. It was rarely eaten since they considered it of no value. Bernal Díaz reports that some of these parts of human flesh made their way to the Tlatelolco market near Tenochtitlan.
- In 2012, The National Institute for Anthropology and History (INAH) reported that they had discovered around 60 skeletons under subway lines in Mexico City, 50 children and 10 adults, dating back 500 years. The skeletons appear to have cut marks on the bones that indicate human sacrifice but do not indicate that cannibalism had occurred.

==== Bernal Díaz's account ====
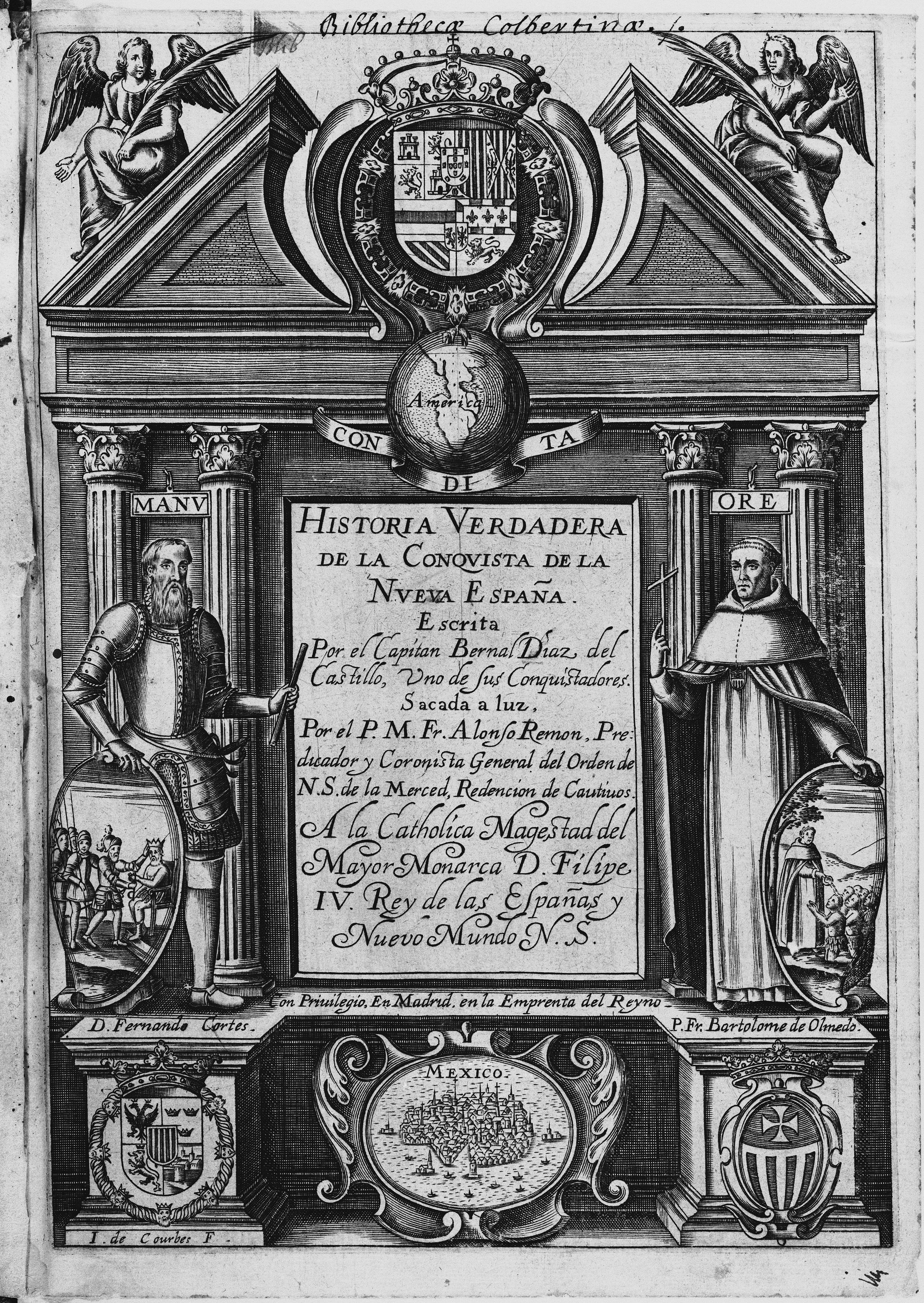
Title page of the original 1632 edition of Bernal Díaz's True History

Bernal Díaz's True History of the Conquest of New Spain (written by 1568, published 1632) contains several accounts of cannibalism among the people the conquistadors encountered during their warring expedition to Tenochtitlan.

- About the city of Cholula, Díaz wrote of his shock at seeing young men in cages ready to be sacrificed and eaten.
- In the same work, Diaz mentions that the Cholulan and Aztec warriors were so confident of victory against the conquistadors in an upcoming battle the following day that "they wished to kill us and eat our flesh, and had already prepared the pots with salt and peppers and tomatoes."
- About the Quetzalcoatl temple of Tenochtitlan, Díaz wrote that inside, there were large pots where the human flesh of sacrificed Natives was boiled and cooked to feed the priests.
- About the Mesoamerican towns in general Díaz wrote that some of the indigenous people he saw were "eating human meat, just like we take cows from the butcher's shops, and they have in all towns thick wooden jail-houses, like cages, and in them they put many Indian men, women and boys to fatten, and being fattened they sacrificed and ate them."

Díaz's testimony is corroborated by other Spanish historians who wrote about the conquest. In History of Tlaxcala (written by 1585), Diego Muñoz Camargo (c. 1529–1599) states that: "Thus there were public butcher's shops of human flesh, as if it were of cow or sheep."

==== Controversy and evidence ====
Accounts of the Aztec Empire as a "Cannibal Kingdom", Marvin Harris's expression, have been commonplace from Bernal Díaz to Harris, William H. Prescott and Michael Harner. Harner has accused his colleagues, especially those in Mexico, of downplaying the evidence of Aztec cannibalism. Ortiz de Montellano argues that the Aztec diet was balanced and that the dietary contribution of cannibalism would not have been very effective as a reward.

In 2015, researchers revealed the discovery of a massive tzompantli skull rack at the Templo Mayor in Mexico City, where hundreds of human skulls were arranged on wooden racks and towers. The scale of the structure suggests it may have held thousands of skulls, and being only one of seven reported tzompantli in the city, although the largest of them, implies a significant scale of ritual human sacrifice in Tenochtitlan. Further excavations reported in 2020 uncovered an additional section of the Huey Tzompantli within the city, contributing 119 more skulls and raising the total displayed to over 600. These remains are believed to date from the late 15th century, likely during the reign of Ahuizotl.

A 2026 study argues that, while there is plentiful evidence for sacrifice, cannibalism may never or rarely have been a part of it, since there is no unambiguous archaeological support for it and since historical accounts of it come chiefly from Spanish sources which are inconsistent and in some cases arguably fabricated.

=== Xiximes ===
As recently as 2008, Mexico's National Institute of Anthropology and History (INAH) derided as a "myth" the historical accounts by Jesuit missionaries reporting ritual cannibalism among the Xiximes people of northern Mexico. But in 2011, archaeologist José Luis Punzo, director of INAH, reported evidence confirming that the Xiximes did indeed practice cannibalism. More than three dozen bones were uncovered inside a cave hamlet that showed distinct signs of butchering and defleshing, confirming contemporary European accounts of the Xiximes. Typically, lone men from other tribes would be targeted, and their bodies would be broken apart at the joints and then cooked. The meat was then mixed with beans and corn into a soup. Tribes of the Xiximes practiced cannibalism in the belief that eating the souls of their enemies and hanging their bones from trees would bring about good crop yields next year, and thus conducted cannibalistic raids as part of their agricultural cycle after every harvest.

== Northern America ==
=== Indigenous Canadians and Native Americans ===
The 1913 Handbook of Indians of Canada (reprinting 1907 material from the Bureau of American Ethnology) ascribed former cannibal practices to dozens of North American Indigenous groups. The forms of cannibalism described included both resorting to human flesh during famines and ritual cannibalism, the latter often consisting of eating just a small portion of an enemy warrior. From another source, according to Hans Egede, when the Inuit killed a woman accused of witchcraft, they ate a portion of her heart.

As with most lurid tales of native cannibalism, these stories are treated with a great deal of scrutiny, as accusations of cannibalism could be used as justifications for the subjugation or destruction of "savages". English professor Patrick Brantlinger suggests that Indigenous peoples that were colonized were being dehumanized as part of the justification for the atrocities.

Human bones dated to the 12th century found at around 40 sites throughout the American Southwest possess clear markings of being butchered and cooked. The defleshing and dismemberment of some bodies are the same as that of animals used for food. The episodes were undertaken at Anasazi sites and may have been caused by a drought. At one settlement, human feces have been found containing the proteins of human flesh, conclusively showing the occurrence of cannibalism.

=== European settlers and explorers ===
Some colonizers from Europe and their descendants practiced survival cannibalism. There is archaeological and written evidence for English settlers' cannibalism in 1609 in the Jamestown Colony under famine conditions, during a period which became known as Starving Time. Travelers through sparsely inhabited regions and explorers of unknown areas sometimes ate human flesh after running out of other provisions. In 1761, three famished British soldiers, among them a sergeant, killed and ate an Abenaki boy. The boy's community reacted by pursuing and killing the three men, which in turn led to a British punitive expedition, in which their village was destroyed.

In a better-known example from the 1840s, the members of the Donner Party found themselves stranded by snow in the Donner Pass, a high mountain pass in California, without adequate supplies during the Mexican–American War, leading to several instances of cannibalism, including the murder of two young Indigenous Miwok men for food. Sir John Franklin's lost polar expedition, which took place at approximately the same time as the Donner Party incident, is another example of cannibalism out of desperation.

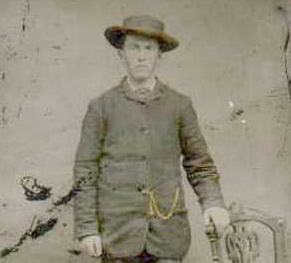
Boone Helm acquired the nickname "Kentucky Cannibal" for eating several other travelers

In frontier situations where there was no strong authority, some individuals got used to killing and eating others, even in situations where other food would have been available. One notorious case was the mountain man Boone Helm, who became known as the "Kentucky Cannibal" for eating several of his fellow travelers from 1850 until his eventual hanging in 1864.

In February 1874, Alfred Packer led five gold prospectors into the San Juan Mountains, ignoring warnings of Ute chief Ouray regarding severe winter conditions. The group became snowbound and ran out of provisions. Two months later, Packer emerged alone at the Los Pinos Indian Agency near Saguache, Colorado, looking surprisingly healthy, while his five companions were missing. He eventually confessed having eaten them, explaining the details in various conflicting versions, which earned him the nickname "Colorado Cannibal". He was originally convicted of murder in 1883, but his sentence was reduced to 40 years in prison for manslaughter in a 1886 retrial.

=== Criminal cases in the 20th century ===
In 1991, Jeffrey Dahmer of Milwaukee, Wisconsin, was arrested after one of his intended victims managed to escape. Found in Dahmer's apartment were two human hearts, an entire torso, a bag full of human organs from his victims, and a portion of an arm muscle. He stated that he planned to consume all of the body parts over the next few weeks.

== See also ==
- Cannibalism in Africa
- Cannibalism in Asia
- Cannibalism in Europe
- Cannibalism in Oceania
- Child cannibalism
- Human sacrifice in Aztec culture
- List of incidents of cannibalism
- Manifesto Antropófago ("Anthropophagic" or "Cannibal Manifesto"), a Brazilian poem
- Robinson Crusoe, an adventure novel depicting fictional Native American cannibals
- Spanish conquest of Yucatán § First encounters: 1502 and 1511
- Wariʼ, an Amerindian people that practiced both endo- and exocannibalism

== Bibliography ==
- Arens, William (1980). The Man-Eating Myth: Anthropology and Anthropophagy. Oxford: Oxford University Press. ISBN 0-19-502793-0.
- Díaz del Castillo, Bernal (1963) [1632]. The Conquest of New Spain. Penguin Classics. J. M. Cohen (trans.) (6th printing (1973) ed.). Harmondsworth, England: Penguin Books. ISBN 0-14-044123-9. OCLC 162351797.
- Díaz del Castillo, Bernal (1992) [1632]. Historia verdadera de la conquista de la Nueva España (in Spanish). Joaquín Ramírez Cabañas (ed., intro. & notes). México D.F.: Editorial Porrúa. ISBN 970-07-1800-X.
- Harner, Michael (1977). "The Enigma of Aztec Sacrifice". Natural History. 86 (4): 46–51. ISSN 0028-0712.
- Harris, Marvin (1991) [1977]. Cannibals and Kings: Origins of Cultures. New York: Vintage Books. ISBN 0-679-72849-X. OCLC 23985455.
- Korn, Daniel; Radice, Mark; Hawes, Charlie (2001). Cannibal: The History of the People-Eaters. London: Channel 4 Books.
- Muñoz Camargo, Diego (1947) [c. 1585]. Historia de Tlaxcala (in Spanish). México D.F.: Publicaciones del Ateneo Nacional de Ciencias y Artes de México.
- Ortiz de Montellano, Bernard R. (1978). "Aztec Cannibalism: An Ecological Necessity?". Science. 200 (4342): 611–617. Bibcode:1978Sci...200..611O. doi:10.1126/science.200.4342.611. PMID 17812682. S2CID 35652641. Archived from the original on August 5, 2009.
- Petrinovich, Lewis F. (2000). The Cannibal Within. New York: Aldine Transaction. ISBN 0-202-02048-7.
