= Marvin Harris bibliography =

This is a two-part chronological list of the works of anthropologist Marvin Harris. The first list contains his scholarly articles; the second contains his books.

== Articles and book chapters ==
- Charles Wagley, ed. (1952), "Race Relations in Minas Velhas, a Community in the Mountain Region of Central Brazil" (PDF), Race and Class in Rural Brazil, Paris: UNESCO, pp. 47–81
- Harris, Marvin (1958), "Portugal's African 'Wards' - A First Hand Report on Labor and Education in Mocambique", Africa Today, 5 (6): 3–36, JSTOR 4183986
  Full version
- 1959
  - Harris, Marvin (1959), "The Economy Has No Surplus?", American Anthropologist, 61 (2): 189–199, doi:10.1525/aa.1959.61.2.02a00010, JSTOR 665092
  - Harris, Marvin (1959), "Caste, Class and Minority", Social Forces, 37 (3): 248–54, doi:10.2307/2572971, JSTOR 2572971
  - Harris, Marvin (1959), "Labor Migration among the Mocambique Thonga: Cultural and Political Factors", Africa, 29 (1): 50–64, doi:10.2307/1157499, JSTOR 1157499, S2CID 146152381
- 1962 - "Race Relations Research and Research Auspices in the United States." Information 1:28-51.
- 1963 - "The Structural Significance of Brazilian Racial Categories" (with Conrad Kottak) Sociologia 25: 203-208 (São Paulo)
- 1964 - "Racial Identity in Brazil." Luso-Brazilian Review 1:21-28.
- 1965 - "The Myth of the Sacred Cow." In Man, Culture and Animals, 217-28. Washington D.C.: American Association for the Advancement of Science.
- 1966
  - "The Cultural Ecology of India's Sacred Cattle", Current Anthropology, 7 (1): 51–54 + 55–56, doi:10.1086/200662, JSTOR 2740230, S2CID 146311072 Full pdf
    "Republished 1992 in", Current Anthropology, Supplement Inquiry and Debate in the Human Sciences: Contributions from Current Anthropology 1960-1990, 33 (1): 261–276, doi:10.1086/204026, JSTOR 2743946, S2CID 143322580
  - "Race, Conflict, and Reform in Mocambique." In The Transformation of East Africa, 157 - 83.
- 1967
  - "The Classification of Stratified Groups." In Social Structure, Stratification, and Mobility, 298 - 324. Washington, D.C.: Pan-American Union.
  - "The Myth of the Sacred Cow." Natural History (March):6-12.
- 1968
  - "Big Bust on Morningside Heights." The Nation June 10, 1968 757-763. *Big Bust on Morningside Heights
  - "Race." in International Encyclopedia of the Social Sciences, 13:263-69.
  - "Report on N.S.F. Grant G.S. 1128, Techniques of Behavioral Analysis." Unpublished manuscript
- 1969 - "Patterns of Authority and Superordination in Lower Class Urban Domiciles." Research proposal submitted to the National Science Foundation. Unpublished manuscript.
- 1970 - "Referential Ambiguity in the Calculus of Brazilian Racial Identity." Southwestern Journal of Anthropology 26:1-14.
- 1971 - "Comments on Alan Heston's 'An Approach to the Sacred Cow of India." Current Anthropology 12: 199-201
- 1972 - "Portugal's Contribution to the Underdevelopment of Africa and Brazil." In Ronald Chilcote, ed., Protest and Resistance in Angola and Brazil Berkeley: University of California Press, pp. 209–223
- 1974 - "Reply to Corry Azzi." Current Anthropology 15: 323.
- 1975 - "Why a Perfect Knowledge of All the Rules That One Must Know in Order to Act Like a Native Cannot Lead to a Knowledge of How Natives Act." Journal of Anthropological Research 30: 242-251
- 1976 - "Levi-Strauss et La Palourde." L'Homme 16: 5 - 22.
- 1976 - "History and Significance of the Emic/Etic Distinction." Annual Review of Anthropology 5:329-50.
- 1977 - "Why Men Dominate Women" New York Times Magazine, date:( )
- 1977 - "Bovine Sex and Species Ratios in India." Paper read at American Anthropological Association meetings in Houston
- 1978
  - "India's Sacred Cow" (PDF), Human Nature, 1 (2): 28–36, February 1978, archived from the original (PDF) on 22 June 2011
    Also published in A.L. Tobias & P.J. Thompson, ed. (1980), Issues in Nutrition for the 1980s: An Ecological Perspective, Monterey, California: Wadsworth
  - "Origins of the U.S. Preference for Beef." Psychology Today, October: 88-94.
- 1979
  - "The Human Strategy: Our Pound of Flesh." Natural History 88:30-41.
  - "Reply to Sahlins." New York Review of Books.
- 1980 - "History and Ideological Significance of the Separation of Social and Cultural Anthropology." In Beyond the Myths of Culture: Essays in Cultural Materialism, edited by Eric Ross, 391-407. New York: Academic Press
- 1982 - "Mother Cow" Anthropology 81/82, Annual Editions
- 1984
  - "Animal Capture and Yanomomo Warfare: Retrospective and New Evidence", Journal of Anthropological Research, 40 (1): 183–201, doi:10.1086/jar.40.1.3629698, JSTOR 3629698, S2CID 147254297
  - "A Cultural Materialist Theory of Band and Village Warfare: The Yanomamo Test." In Warfare, Culture, and Environment, edited by R. Brian Ferguson, 111-40. Orlando: Academic Press
- 1987 - "Cultural Materialism: Alarums and Excursions." In Waymarks: The Notre Dame Inaugural lectures in Anthropology
- 1990 - "Emics and Etics Revisited; Harris's Reply to Pike; Harris's Final Response." In Emics and Etics: The Insider/Outsider Debate, edited by Thomas N. Headland, Kenneth L. Pike, and Marvin Harris, 48-61, 75-83, 202-16. Newbury Park: Sage.
- 1991 - "Anthropology: Ships that Crash in the Night." In Perspectives on Social Science: The Colorado Lectures, edited by Richard Jessor, 70-114. Boulder, CO: Westview.
- 1992 - "Distinguished Lecture: Anthropology and the Theoretical and Paradigmatic Significance of the Collapse of the Soviet and European Communism." American Anthropologist 94:295-305.
- 1993
  - "Who are the Whites?" Social Forces 72: 451-62.
  - "The Evolution of Gender Hierarchies: a Trial Formulation." in Sex and Gender Hierarchies, edited by Barbara Diane Miller
- Robert Borofsky, ed. (1994), "Cultural Materialism is Alive and Well and Won't Go Away Until Something Better Comes Along", Assessing Cultural Anthropology, New York: McGraw Hill, ISBN 978-0-07-006578-9
- 1995
  - "Commentary on articles by Nancy Scheper-Hughes and Roy D'Andrade. Current Anthropology 36: 423-24.
  - "Anthropology and Postmodernism" in Science, Materialism, and the Study of Culture (which is dedicated to Harris) edited by Martin F. Murphy and Maxine L. Margolis.

== Books ==
- 1964 Patterns of Race in the Americas ISBN 0-313-22359-9 (adapted from material delivered on the Columbia Lectures in International Studies television series)
- 1964 The Nature of Cultural Things. Studies in Anthropology Series AS5. Random House Paperback. Library of Congress Catalogue Card Number: 63-19713
- 1968 The Rise of Anthropological Theory: A History of Theories of Culture
- 1969 Town and Country in Brazil ISBN 0-404-50587-2
- 1971 Culture, Man, and Nature: An Introduction to General Anthropology (1st Edition)
- 1974 Cows, Pigs, Wars, and Witches: The Riddles of Culture ISBN 0-679-72468-0
- 1977 Cannibals and Kings: Origins of Cultures ISBN 0-679-72849-X
- 1979 Cultural Materialism: The Struggle for a Science of Culture
- 1981 America Now: Why Nothing Works (Re-printed in 1987 as Why Nothing Works: The Anthropology of Daily Life) ISBN 0-671-63577-8
- 1985 Good to Eat: Riddles of Food and Culture (Re-printed in 1987 as The Sacred Cow and the Abominable Pig: Riddles of Food and Culture; re-printed in 1998 as Good to Eat: Riddles of Food and Culture) ISBN 1-57766-015-3
- 1987 Death, Sex, and Fertility: Population Regulation in Preindustrial and Developing Societies ISBN 0-231-06270-2
- 1987 Food and Evolution: Toward a Theory of Human Food Habits (editor) ISBN 0-87722-668-7
- 1990 Emics and Etics : The Insider/Outsider Debate (editor) ISBN 0-8039-3738-5
- 1990 Our Kind: Who We Are, Where We Came From, Where We Are Going ISBN 0-06-091990-6
- 1997 Culture, People, Nature: An Introduction to General Anthropology (7th Edition) ISBN 0-673-99093-1
- 1999 Harris, Marvin (1999), Theories of Culture in Postmodern Times, Rowman Altamira, ISBN 9780761990215 Paperback ISBN 0-7619-9021-6
- 2001 Harris, Marvin (2001), The Rise of Anthropological Theory: A History of Theories of Culture (Updated ed.), Rowman Altamira, ISBN 9780759101333 Paperback ISBN 0-7591-0133-7
- 2001 Harris, Marvin (2001), Cultural Materialism: The Struggle for a Science of Culture (Updated ed.), Rowman Altamira, ISBN 9780759101357 Paperback ISBN 0-7591-0135-3
- 2007 Cultural Anthropology (7th Edition) ISBN 0-205-45443-7
