= Marvin Harris =

American anthropologist (1927–2001)

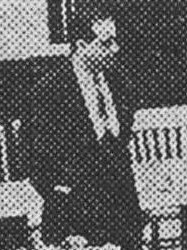
- Harris in 1965
- Born: August 18, 1927; Brooklyn, New York, U.S.
- Died: October 25, 2001 (aged 74); Gainesville, Florida, U.S.
- Education: Columbia University
- Known for: Contributions to the development of cultural materialism
- Scientific career
- Fields: Anthropology
- Workplaces: University of Florida

Marvin Harris (August 18, 1927 – October 25, 2001) was an American anthropologist. He was born in Brooklyn, New York City. A prolific writer, he was highly influential in the development of cultural materialism. In his work, he combined Karl Marx's emphasis on the forces of production with Thomas Malthus's insights on the impact of demographic factors on other parts of the sociocultural system.

Labeling demographic and production factors as infrastructure, Harris posited these factors as key in determining a society's social structure and culture. After the publication of The Rise of Anthropological Theory in 1968, Harris helped focus the interest of anthropologists in cultural-ecological relationships for the rest of his career. Many of his publications gained wide circulation among lay readers.

Over the course of his professional life, Harris drew both a loyal following and a considerable amount of criticism. He became a regular fixture at the annual meetings of the American Anthropological Association, where he would subject scholars to intense questioning from the floor, podium, or bar. He is considered a generalist, who had an interest in the global processes that account for human origins and the evolution of human cultures.

In his final book, Theories of Culture in Postmodern Times, Harris argued that the political consequences of postmodern theory were harmful, a critique similar to those later developed by philosopher Richard Wolin and others.

== Early life and education ==
Marvin Harris was born in 1927 to a very poor Russian-Jewish family in Brooklyn, where he grew up.

After World War II, Harris served in the U.S. Army Transportation Corps, from 1945 to 1947. He then used funding from the G.I. Bill to enter Columbia University, along with a new generation of post-war American anthropologists. Harris was an avid reader who loved to spend hours at the race track and he eventually developed a complex mathematical betting system that was successful enough to provide support for his wife, Madelyn, and him during his years of graduate school.

Harris' graduate work was supervised by Charles Wagley, an expert on Brazil who had been a student of Franz Boas; as a result, Harris' dissertation research was conducted in Brazil within the framework of the Boasian idiographic tradition in anthropology, a framework that he would subsequently argue against with his developing nomothetic scientific approach. After graduation with a Ph.D. in anthropology in 1953, Harris was hired as an assistant professor at Columbia and, while undertaking fieldwork in Mozambique in 1957, Harris underwent a series of profound transformations that altered his theoretical and political orientations.

== Academic career ==
Harris received both his MA and PhD degrees from Columbia University, the former in 1949 and the latter in 1953. He performed fieldwork in Brazil and Portuguese-speaking Africa before joining the faculty at Columbia. He eventually became chairman of the anthropology department at Columbia. During the Columbia student campus occupation of 1968, Harris was among the few faculty leaders who sided with the students when they were threatened and beaten by the police. During the 1960s and 1970s, he was a resident of Leonia in New Jersey.

Harris next joined the University of Florida anthropology department in 1981 and retired in 2000, becoming the Anthropology Graduate Research Professor Emeritus. Harris also served as the Chair of the General Anthropology Division of the American Anthropological Association from 1988 to 1990.

Harris was the author of seventeen books. Two of his college textbooks, Culture, People, Nature: An Introduction to General Anthropology and Cultural Anthropology, were published in seven editions. His research spanned the topics of race, evolution, food, and culture. His research and writings often focused on Latin America, most specifically Brazil, Ecuador, and the Bay Islands of Honduras, but he also conducted research in Mozambique and India.

== Theoretical contributions ==
Harris' earliest work began in the Boasian tradition of descriptive anthropological fieldwork, but his fieldwork experiences in Mozambique in the late 1950s caused him to shift his focus from ideological features of culture toward behavioral aspects. His 1968 history of anthropological thought, The Rise of Anthropological Theory, critically examined hundreds of years of social thought with the intent of constructing a viable understanding of human culture that Harris came to call "cultural materialism". The book, known as "The RAT" among students, is a synthesis of classical and contemporary macrosocial theory.

Cultural materialism incorporated and refined Marx's categories of superstructure and base. Harris modified and amplified such core Marxist concepts as means of production and exploitation, but Harris rejected two key aspects of Marxist thought: the dialectic, which Harris attributed to an intellectual vogue of Marx's time; and unity of theory and practice, which Harris regarded as an inappropriate and damaging stance for social scientists. Harris also integrated Malthus' population theory into his research strategy as a major determinant factor in sociocultural evolution, which also contrasted with Marx's rejection of population as a causal element.

According to Harris, the principal mechanisms by which a society exploits its environment are contained in a society's infrastructure—the mode of production (technology and work patterns) and population (such as population characteristics, fertility and mortality rates). Since such practices are essential for the continuation of life itself, widespread social structures and cultural values and beliefs must be consistent with these practices. Since the aim of science, Harris writes:

is the discovery of the maximum amount of order in its field of inquiry, priority for theory building logically settles upon those sectors under the greatest direct restraints from the givens of nature. To endow the mental superstructure [ideas and ideologies] with strategic priority, as the cultural idealists advocate, is a bad bet. Nature is indifferent to whether God is a loving father or a bloodthirsty cannibal. But nature is not indifferent to whether the fallow period in a swidden [slash and burn] field is one year or ten. We know that powerful restraints exist on the infrastructural level; hence it is a good bet that these restraints are passed on to the structural and superstructural components. (Harris 1979, 57)

Harris made a critical distinction between emic and etic, which he refined considerably since its exposition in The Rise of Anthropological Theory. The terms "emic" and "etic" originated in the work of missionary-linguist Kenneth Pike, despite the latter's conceptual differences with Harris' constructs. As used by Harris, emic meant those descriptions and explanations that are right and meaningful to an informant or subject, whereas etic descriptions and explanations are those used by the scientific community to germinate and force theories of sociocultural life. That is, emic is the participant's perspective, whereas etic is the observer's. Harris had asserted that both are in fact necessary for an explanation of human thought and behavior.

Harris' early contributions to major theoretical issues include his revision of biological surplus theory in obesity formation. He also became well known for formulating a materialist explanation for the treatment of cattle in religion in Indian culture. Along with Michael Harner, Harris is one of the scholars most associated with the suggestion that Aztec cannibalism was widespread and resulted from protein deficiency in their diet. An explanation appears in Harris' book Cannibals and Kings. Harris also invoked the human quest for animal protein to explain Yanomamo warfare, contradicting ethnographer Napoleon Chagnon’s sociobiological explanation involving innate male human aggressiveness.

Several other publications by Harris examine the cultural and material roots of dietary traditions in many cultures, including Cows, Pigs, Wars, and Witches: The Riddles of Culture (1974); Good to Eat: Riddles of Food and Culture (1985; reprinted in 1987 as The Sacred Cow and the Abominable Pig) and his co-edited volume, Food and Evolution: Toward a Theory of Human Food Habits (1987).

Harris' America Now: the Anthropology of a Changing Culture (1981; reprinted in 1987 as Why Nothing Works: The Anthropology of Daily Life) applies concepts from cultural materialism to the explanation of such social developments in late twentieth century United States as inflation, the entry of large numbers of women into the paid labor force, marital stability, and shoddy products.

His Our Kind: Who We Are, Where We're From, Where We Are (1990) surveys the broad sweep of human physical and cultural evolution, offering provocative explanations of such subjects as human transsexualism and nontranssexualism and the origins of inequality. Finally, Harris' 1979 work, Cultural Materialism: The Struggle for a Science of Culture, updated and re-released in 2001, offers perhaps the most comprehensive statement of cultural materialism. A separate article lists the many and diverse publications of Marvin Harris.

=== Criticisms and controversies ===
While Harris' contributions to anthropology are wide, it has been said that "Other anthropologists and observers had almost as many opinions about Dr. Harris as he had about why people behave as they do." In popular media the Smithsonian magazine called him "one of the most controversial anthropologists alive," The Washington Post described him as "a storm center in his field", and the Los Angeles Times accused him of "overgeneralized assumptions".

== Bibliography ==
Writings by Harris meant for the general public include:

- Harris, Marvin (1964). The Nature of Cultural Things. New York: Random House.
- —— (1964). Patterns of Race in the Americas. Walker. OL 5919413M.
- —— (1974). Cows, Pigs, Wars and Witches: The Riddles of Culture. London: Hutchinson. ISBN 0-09-122750-X. Reissued in 1991 by Vintage, New York.
- —— (1977). Cannibals and Kings: The Origins of Cultures. New York: Vintage. ISBN 0-394-40765-2.
- —— (1987). Why Nothing Works: The Anthropology of Daily Life. New York: Simon & Schuster. ISBN 0-671-63577-8. (Originally published in 1981 as America Now: The Anthropology of a Changing Culture)
- —— (1990). Our Kind: who we are, where we came from, where we are going. New York: HarperCollins/Harper Perennial. ISBN 0-06-091990-6.
- —— (1998). Good to Eat: Riddles of Food and Culture. Illinois: Waveland Press. ISBN 1-57766-015-3. (Originally published in 1985 by Simon and Schuster; reprinted in 1987 by Simon & Schuster as The Sacred Cow and the Abominable Pig)

More academically oriented works include:

- Harris, Marvin (1968). The Rise of Anthropological Theory: A History of Theories of Culture. New York: Thomas Y. Cromwell Company. ISBN 0-690-70322-8.
- —— (1979). Cultural Materialism: The Struggle for a Science of Culture. California: AltaMira Press. ISBN 0-394-41240-0.
- ——; Ross, Eric B., eds. (1987). Food and Evolution: Towards a Theory of Human Food Habits. Philadelphia: Temple University Press. ISBN 0-87722-668-7.
- ——; —— (1987). Death, Sex, and Fertility: Population Regulation in Preindustrial and Developing Societies. New York: Columbia University Press.
- —— (1999). Theories of Culture in Postmodern Times. California: AltaMira Press. ISBN 0-7619-9020-8.
