= Andreas Kolbe =

German printer

Andreas Kolbe (fl. 1557) was a German printer, prominent in Marburg in the 1540s and 1550s. As of 1540 he ran Christian Egenolff's printing shop in Marburg. In 1546 he published for Johann Oldendorp, a jurist. He was a known printer of Hans Staden and published his Warhaftig Historia in 1557. He was still living in 1562.
