= Johann Oldendorp =

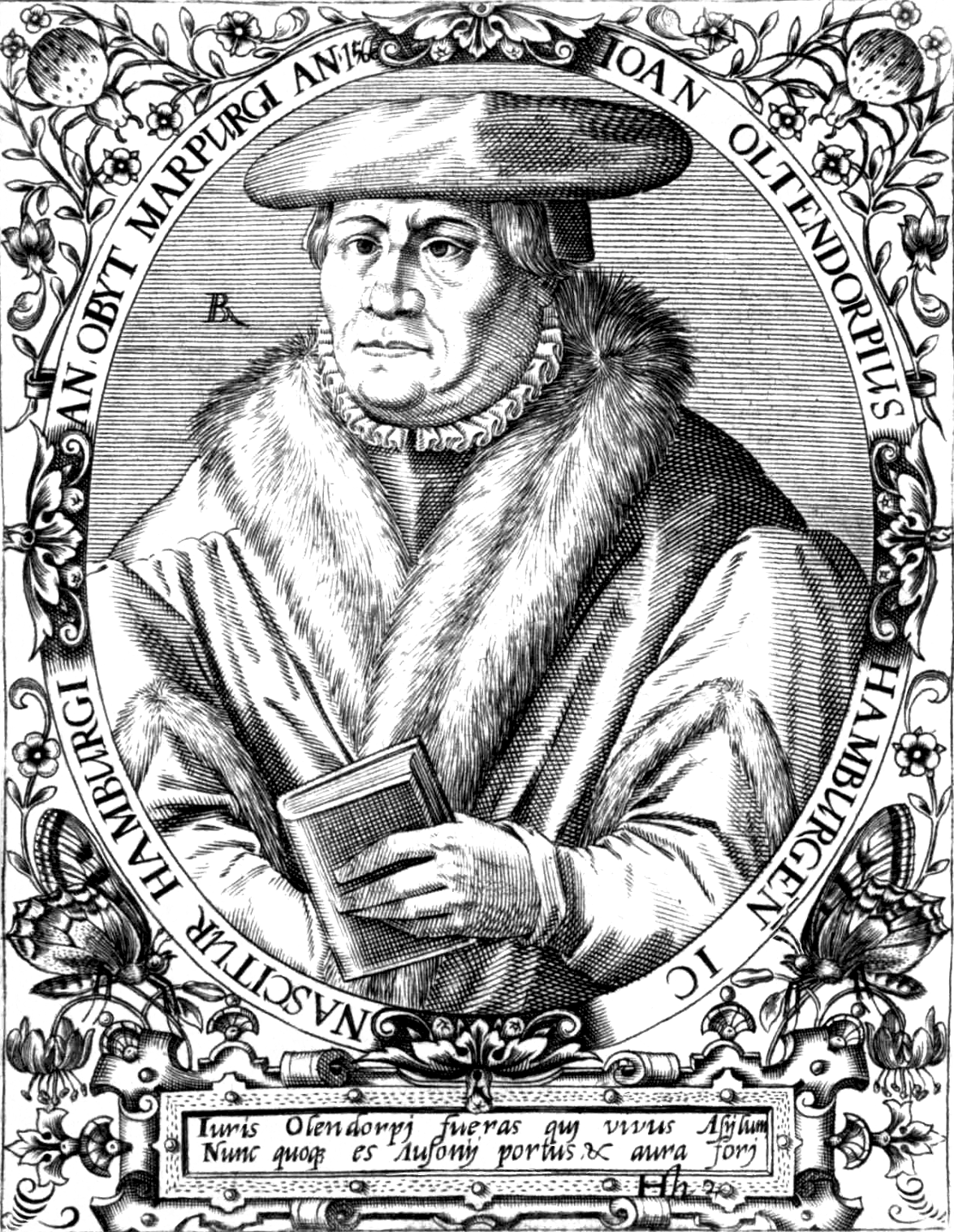
Johann Oldendorp.

Johann Oldendorp (c. 1486 – 3 June 1567) was a German jurist and reformer.

Oldendorp was born in Hamburg. He was the son of a merchant and the nephew (on his mother's side) of the historian Albert Krantz, from whom he probably received his early education. In 1504, he attended the University of Rostock and later graduated from the university of Bologna, Italy, in 1515. In 1516, he was appointed Professor at Greifswald, where he served from 1517 as the Rector. He received his doctorate in 1520, and became a professor at the University of Frankfurt / Oder. In 1526 he moved to Rostock where he became a civic official: in 1534 he transferred to Lübeck and held a similar position. In 1543, he went to Cologne and was recalled by Landgrave Philipp I of Hesse in July 1543 to Marburg. This was the first Protestant university. Oldendorp wrote on topics that covered a variety of legal and philosophical issues regarding history; one of his printers was Andreas Kolbe. He died in Marburg in 1567.

== Works ==
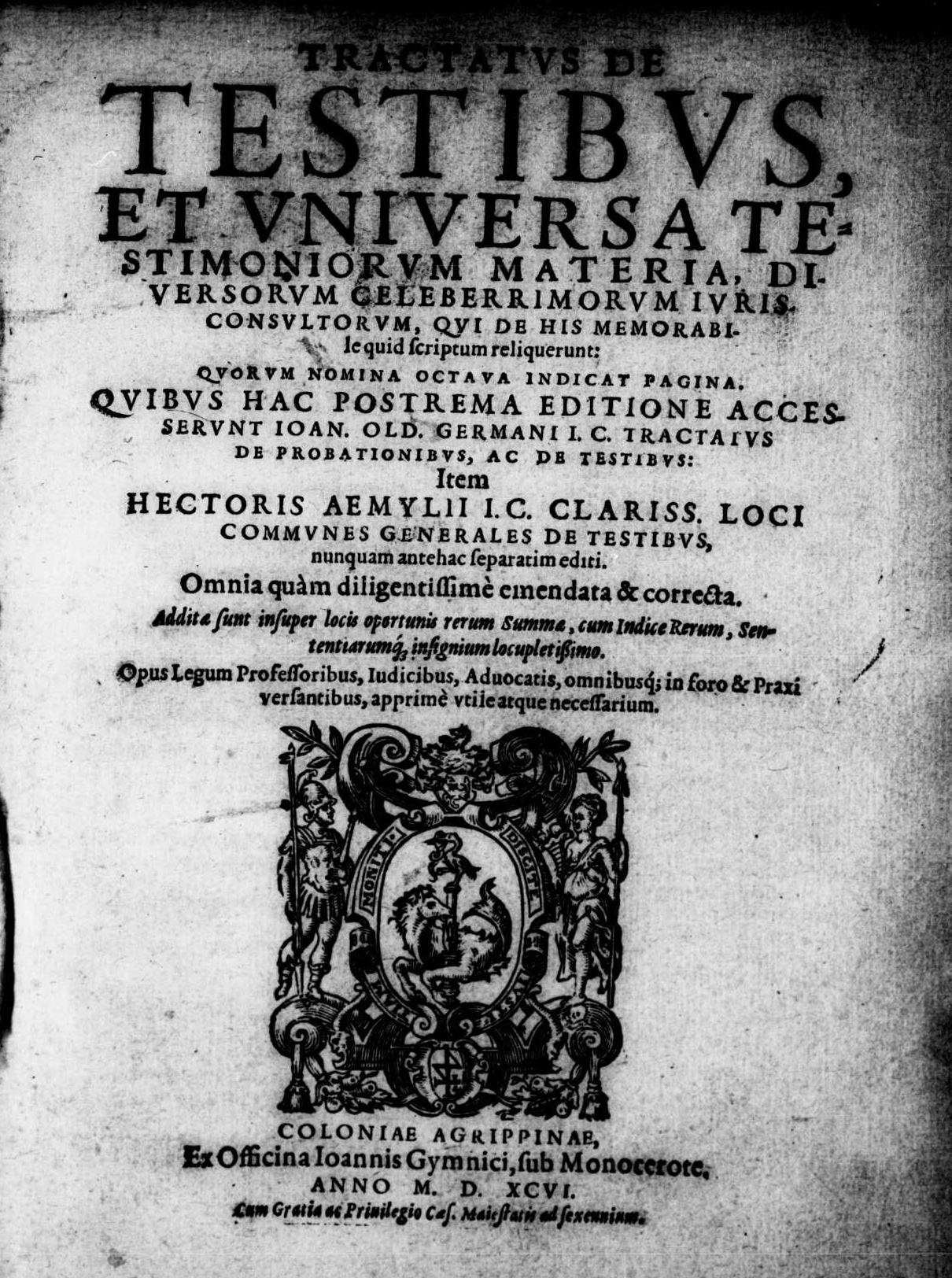
Tractatus de testibus et universa testimoniorum materia, 1596

- Wat byllich und recht ist, Rostock, 1529.
- Ratmannenspiegel, Rostock, 1530.
- Iuris naturalis gentium et civilis isagoge, Antwerp, 1539.
- Loci communes iuris civilis, Lowen, 1545.
- Tractatus de testibus et universa testimoniorum materia (in Latin). Köln: Johann Gymnich. 1596.
