= Cultural materialism (anthropology) =

Anthropological research orientation

Cultural materialism is an anthropological research orientation first introduced by Marvin Harris in his 1968 book The Rise of Anthropological Theory, as a theoretical paradigm and research strategy. It is said to be the most enduring achievement of that work. Harris subsequently developed a full elaboration and defense of the paradigm in his 1979 book Cultural Materialism. To Harris, social change is dependent on three factors: a society's infrastructure, structure, and superstructure.

Harris's concept of cultural materialism was influenced by the writings of Karl Marx and Friedrich Engels, as well as their theories as modified by Karl August Wittfogel and his 1957 book Oriental Despotism: A Comparative Study of Total Power. Yet this materialism is distinct from Marxist dialectical materialism, as well as from philosophical materialism. Thomas Malthus's work encouraged Harris to consider reproduction of equal importance to production. The research strategy was also influenced by the work of earlier anthropologists including Herbert Spencer, Edward Tylor and Lewis Henry Morgan who, in the 19th century, first proposed that cultures evolved from the less complex to the more complex over time. Leslie White and Julian Steward and their theories of cultural evolution and cultural ecology were instrumental in the reemergence of evolutionist theories of culture in the 20th century and Harris took inspiration from them in formulating cultural materialism.

== Epistemological principles ==
Cultural materialism is a scientific research strategy and as such utilizes the scientific method. Other important principles include operational definitions, Karl Popper's falsifiability, Thomas Kuhn's paradigms, and the positivism first proposed by Auguste Comte and popularized by the Vienna Circle. The primary question that arises in applying the techniques of science to understand the differences and similarities between cultures is how the research strategy "treats the relationship between what people say and think as subjects and what they say and think and do as objects of scientific inquiry".

== Theoretical principles ==
- Etic and behavioral infrastructure, comprising a society's relations to the environment, which includes their ethics and behavioral modes of production and reproduction (material relations).
- Etic and behavioral Structure, the ethics and behavioral domestic and political economies of a society (social relations).
- Etic and behavioral Superstructure, the ethics and behavioral symbolic and ideational aspects of a society, e.g. the arts, rituals, sports and games, and science (symbolic and ideational relations).
- Emic and mental Superstructure, including "conscious and unconscious cognitive goals, categories, rules, plans, values, philosophies, and beliefs" (meaningful or ideological relations).

Within this division of culture, cultural materialism argues for what is referred to as the principle of probabilistic infrastructural determinism. The essence of its materialist approach is that the infrastructure is in almost all circumstances the most significant force behind the evolution of a culture. Structure and superstructure are not considered "insignificant, epiphenomenal reflexes of infrastructural forces". The structure and symbolic/ideational aspects act as regulating mechanisms within the system as a whole.

== Research ==
During the 1980s, Marvin Harris had a productive interchange with behavioral psychologists, most notably Sigrid Glenn, regarding interdisciplinary work. Very recently, behavioral psychologists have produced a set of basic exploratory experiments in an effort toward this end. More recently young anthropologists have re-approached the work of Marvin Harris as part of a new anthropology of infrastructures.

== See also ==
- Marvin Harris
- Maxine Margolis
- Jerald T. Milanich
