= Tecoaque =

Aztec town

Coordinates: 19.58570°N 98.62458°W

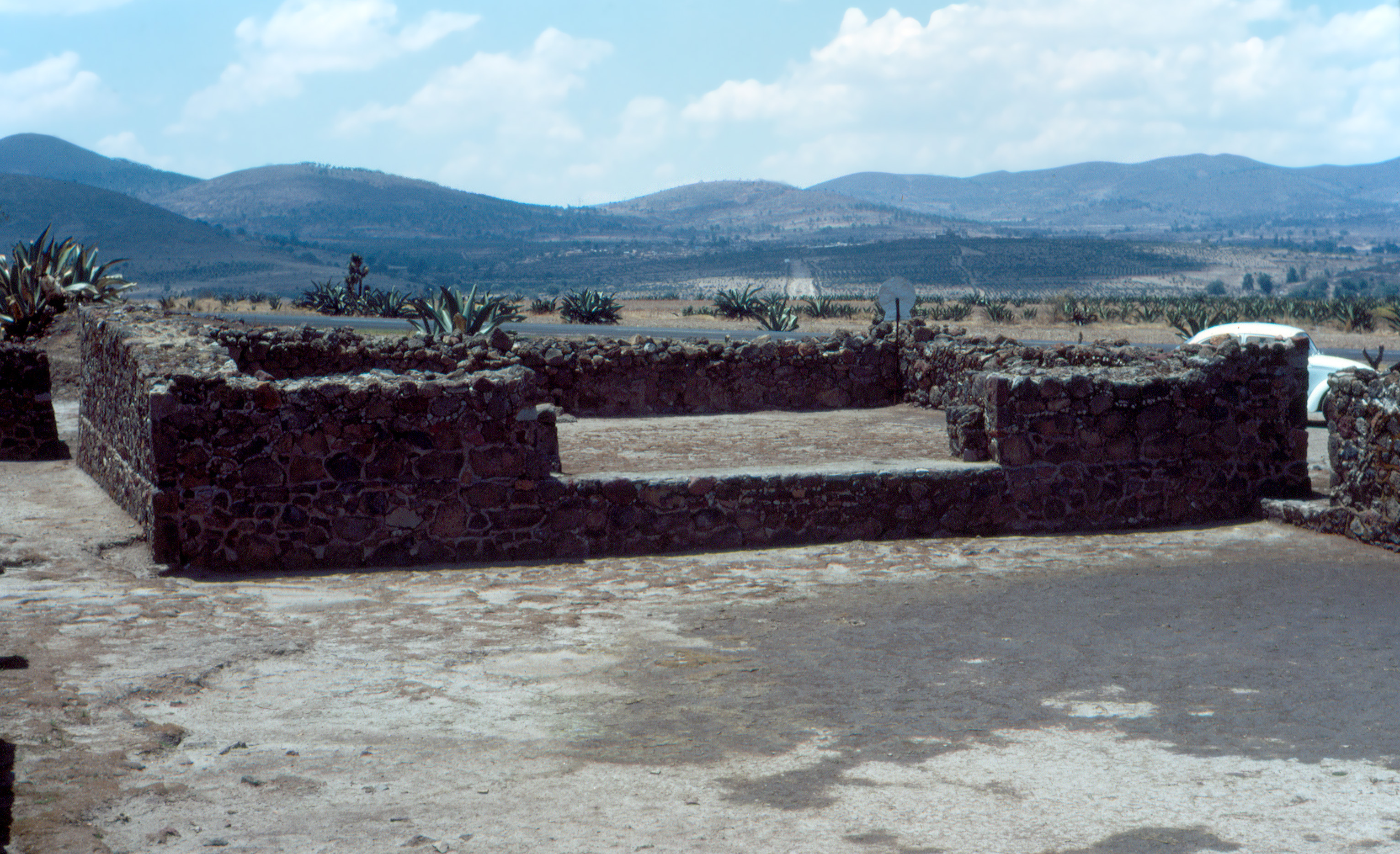
Tecoaque, western Tlaxcala state.

Tecoaque is a Mesoamerican archaeological site, located in western Tlaxcala state, central Mexico, close to Calpulalpan. The site was inhabited by the Acolhua, one of the three ethnic groups making up the Aztec Empire (their capital being Tetzcohco, one of the three seats of Aztec power). Tecoaque had many white-stucco temples and was the home to approximately 5,000 people, mostly priests and farmers.

== Etymology ==
The name is a colonial transcription of the Nahuatl Tēcuahqueh, meaning both "they ate people" and "people eaters". It consists of tē-, the indefinite object prefix for people; cuah, the past / participle form of the verb cua (to eat), meaning "ate" / "eating"; and the plural suffix -queh.

Tecoaque replaced the earlier name of Zōltepēc, meaning "at quail mountain" (from zōlin, quail, and tepētl, mountain).

== Site description ==
Tecoaque includes a prominent circular structure dedicated to Ehecatl. Parts of this primary three-tiered structure, which has an eastern facing stairway, were restored in 1992. Nearby archaeological features include residential structures and an important rectangular plaza.

== World Heritage status ==
This site was added to the UNESCO World Heritage Tentative List on 6 December 2004 in the Cultural category.

== 1520 capture of Spanish civilians ==
Initially, the Aztecs emperor Moctezuma allowed the Spaniards, led by Hernán Cortés into Tenochtitlan. Cortés turned on the Aztecs, taking Montezuma hostage, in order to control the empire through him. In the midst of this strategy, Pánfilo de Narváez arrived in Mexico from Cuba to arrest Cortés. The conquistador left Tenochtitlan in the hands of Pedro de Alvarado, who ordered the massacre of nearly 1000 Mexica who were participating in the festival of Toxcatl. After dealing with Narváez, Cortés prepared to return to Tenochtitlan with a bigger force, having taken control of Narváez's crews. But first he sent ahead a caravan of supplies and people, including "Spanish women and children, enslaved Africans, and other servants carrying burdens and leading livestock."

Learning of Alvarado's massacre, Cortés then rushed to Tenochtitlan to try to quell the violent reaction to the Spaniards' cruelty. Not longer after he arrived, however, he and his men were expelled, resulting in the deaths of nearly all the soldiers and horses Narváez had brought. Before being completely routed, the Spaniards killed Cacamatzin, king of the Acolhua capital of Texcoco. Not long afterward, the slow caravan that Cortés had sent first came through a mountain pass just north of Iztaccihuatl. A recent archaeological expedition revealed that Acolhua warriors captured this group of Spanish civilians as they traveled to Tenochtitlan. The Acolhua were part of the Aztec Empire, and acted in response to the murder of Cacamatzin, their king. This expedition reveals that the Aztecs did resist the Spanish Conquest.

The Aztecs imprisoned the Spanish caravan and over the course of six months, several hundred Spaniards and their slaves were sacrificed, tortured and partially eaten. The bones found shows that about 550 victims had their hearts ripped out during ritual offerings, and had their bones boiled and scraped clean.

"It was a continuous sacrifice over six months. While the prisoners were listening to their companions being sacrificed, the next ones were being selected", Enrique Martinez, director of the archaeologist dig explained to a visiting reporter from the Reuters news agency.

When Cortés found out much later what had been done to his people in Zōltepēc, he renamed the town Tēcuahqueh which means "they ate people" or "people eaters" in the indigenous Nahuatl language. He then sent an army to destroy the town.

Research published by the INAH in January 2021 found that more than 20 Aztec women and children were massacred when the Spaniards conquered the town. The residents had known a revenge attack was coming and tried in vain to defend the city. No men were found among the victims, presumably because the warriors had managed to flee. The conquerors also burned the temples and decapitated statues.

== See also ==
- Cannibalism in the Americas § Aztecs
