= Agricultural cycle =

Annual cycle of crop growth/harvest activities

The agricultural cycle is the annual cycle of activities related to the growth and harvest of a crop (plant). These activities include loosening the soil, seeding, special watering, moving plants when they grow bigger, and harvesting, among others. Without these activities, a crop cannot be grown. The main steps for agricultural practices include preparation of soil, sowing, adding manure and fertilizers, irrigation, harvesting, and storage.

== Seeding ==
The fundamental factor in the process of seeding is dependent on the properties of both seed and the soil it is being planted in. The prior step associated with seeding is crop selection, which mainly consists of two techniques: sexual and asexual. Asexual technique includes all forms of the vegetative process such as budding, grafting and layering. Sexual technique involves growing of the plant from a seed. Grafting is referred to as the artificial method of propagation in which parts of plants are joined together in order to make them bind together and continue growing as one plant. Grafting is mainly applied to two parts of the plant: the dicot and the gymnosperms due to the presence of vascular cambium between the plant tissues: xylem and phloem. A grafted plant consists of two parts: first rootstock, which is the lower part of the plant that comprises roots and the lowest part of the shoot; second, the branches and primary stem, which consists of the upper and main part of the shoot which gradually develops into a fully nourished plant. Budding is another form of asexual reproduction in which the new plant develops from a productive objective source of the parent plant. It is a method in which a bud from the plant is joined onto the stem of another plant. The plant in which the bud is implanted in eventually develops into a replica of the parent plant. The new plant can either divert its ways into forming an independent plant; however, in numerous cases it may remain attached and form various accumulations.

== Seedling ==
Germination is a process by which the seed develops into a seedling. The vital conditions necessary for this process are water, air, temperature, energy, viability and enzymes. If any of these conditions are absent, the process cannot undergo successfully. Germination is also known as sprouting; it is also considered the first sign of life shown by a seed.

== Pollination ==
The process of pollination refers to the transfer of pollen to the female organs of the plant. Optimum factors for ideal pollination are a relative humidity rate of 50–70% and temperature of 24.4 °C. If the humidity rate is higher than 90%, the pollen would not shed. Increasing air circulation is a favourable method of keeping humidity levels under control.

== Irrigation ==
Irrigation is the process of artificially applying water to soil to allow plant growth. This term is preferably used when large amounts of water is applied to dry, arid regions in order to facilitate plant growth. The process of irrigation not only increases the growth rate of the plant but also increases the yield amount. In temperate and tropical areas rainfall and snowfall are the main suppliers of irrigation water, but in dry places with unfavourable weather conditions, groundwater serves as an essential source. Groundwater collects in basins made up of gravel and aquifers, which are water-holding rocks. Dams also act as an essential distributive source of irrigation water. Underground wells also play an important role in storing water for irrigation, specifically in America, and Arizona, in particular. Water and debris from streams filled by water accumulated during storms also collect into underground basins. There are two types of irrigation techniques: spray irrigation and drip irrigation. Drip irrigation is regarded as more efficient as less water evaporates than in spray irrigation.

== See also ==
- Rabi crop and Kharif crop, agricultural cycles of Indian subcontinent
