= Cannibals and Kings =

1977 book by Marvin Harris

- First edition cover
- Author: Marvin Harris
- Publisher: Random House
- Publication date: 1977
- ISBN: 0-394-40765-2

Cannibals and Kings (1977) is a book written by American anthropologist Marvin Harris. The book presents a systematic discussion of ideas about the reasons for a culture making a transition by stages from egalitarian hunter-gatherer to hierarchically based states as population density increases.

== Content ==
According to Harris, humans shifted from a low-carbohydrate diet largely based on hunter-gatherer sources to a high-carbohydrate diet largely based on agricultural when intensive agriculture began. Harris posits that this diet change resulted in more body fat, which for females led to earlier menarche and smaller reduction in fertility from nursing infants, which then led to shorter periods between pregnancies.

Harris also describes the state of the world in the late 19th century as one of approaching catastrophe as predicted by Malthus (Malthusian catastrophe). Harris then discusses three 20th-century innovations that explain this postponement of the catastrophe: the exploitation of petroleum, reliable contraceptives, and social changes in some cultures that make smaller families more desirable.

=== Pork as a taboo food ===
Cannibals and Kings discusses the development of pork as a taboo food in ancient Israelite society. Harris argues that while cattle, sheep, and many other domesticated animals consume grass, pigs are poor grazers and compete with humans for grain. In addition, pigs produce only meat, compared with cattle and goats, which also provide milk, transport, and labor.

This led to pigs being reviled, and he argues this gave rise to the pig as a non-kosher food in the Old Testament. He briefly discusses the other Jewish food taboos. Harris notes that pigs were also taboo in Ancient Egypt and continue to be forbidden by Islam, suggesting that environmental rather than cultural factors were responsible for putting this food animal off-limits.

=== Holy cows ===
Harris also discusses the cow as a sacred animal and taboo food in Hindu culture. Unlike the Middle Eastern civilizations, India had developed very productive forms of agriculture, requiring heavy labor. The high population densities and the periodic droughts rendered animal husbandry for food purposes impractical, and slowly led to the ending of animal sacrifice. Cattle remained an important species because it provided farm labor.

Desperation incurred during periods of drought might lead to the temptation to slaughter and eat the work animals for short-term survival; this would damage long-term prospects by destroying the means of production. Harris argues that this situation led to the evolution of the cow as a taboo food and its worship as a sacred creature in India.

=== Irrigation for agriculture ===
Harris examines the concept of the hydraulic empire, ancient civilizations such as China, Persia, and Egypt that were reliant on water for agriculture. The necessity of labor-intensive projects such as irrigation, canals, and flood control dikes led to the development of strong, centralized, and despotic states to mobilize the needed manpower for construction. Despite foreign conquest or change of government, the nature of such states would remain essentially unchanged because of the unchanging need to mobilize human labor.

Because European agriculture relied upon rainfall and not irrigation, Harris argues, European rulers under feudalism were unable to effectively monopolize power and restrict the rising power of towns. The growth of towns and cities, from a combination of population growth and urban migration, would lead to early forms of market economies.

== See also ==
- Cannibalism in the Americas
