= Hans Staden =

German soldier and explorer

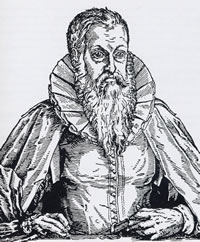
Hans Staden by H. J. Winkelmann, 1664

Hans Staden (c. 1525 – c. 1576) was a German soldier and explorer who voyaged to South America in the middle of the sixteenth century, where he was captured by the Tupinambá people of Brazil. He managed to survive and return safe to Europe. In his widely read True History: An Account of Cannibal Captivity in Brazil, he claimed that the native people that held him captive practiced cannibalism.

== Trips to South America ==
Staden was born in Homberg in the Landgraviate of Hesse. He had received a good education and was in moderate circumstances when desire for travel led him to enlist in 1547 on a ship that was bound for Brazil. He returned from this first trip on 8 October 1548, and, going to Seville, enlisted for a second trip as a volunteer in an expedition for Río de la Plata which sailed in March 1549. On reaching the mouth of the river, two ships sank in a storm. After vainly trying to build a barque, part of the shipwrecked crew set out overland for Asunción. The rest of the crew, including Staden (a knowledgeable gunman), sailed upon the third vessel for the island of São Vicente, but were also wrecked. Staden, with a few survivors, reached the continent in 1552, where he was hired by the Portuguese thanks to his knowledge of the cannon.

A few weeks later, while engaged in a hunting expedition, Staden was captured by a party belonging to the Tupinambá people of Brazil, an enemy group of the Tupiniquim people and their Portuguese allies. As Staden was part of a Portuguese crew, he was perceived of as an enemy of the Tupinamba and they carried him to their village (the predecessor of today's Ubatuba) where he claimed he was to be devoured at the next festivity. However, Staden allegedly won the favor of the Tupinamba Chief Cunhambebe by translating between the Tupinamba and European traders as well as predicting a Tupinikin attack on the tribe, thus his life was spared. Furthermore, when Staden later claimed to have cured the tribal king and his household from illness through the power of prayer and Christianity, the Tupinamba embraced him and called him "Scheraeire", meaning "Son, do not let me die". The Portuguese tried several times to negotiate for Staden's ransom, but the Indians declined all overtures. At last he made his escape on a French ship, and on 22 February 1555, arrived at Honfleur, in Normandy, and from there went immediately to his native city.

== Narrative of his captivity ==
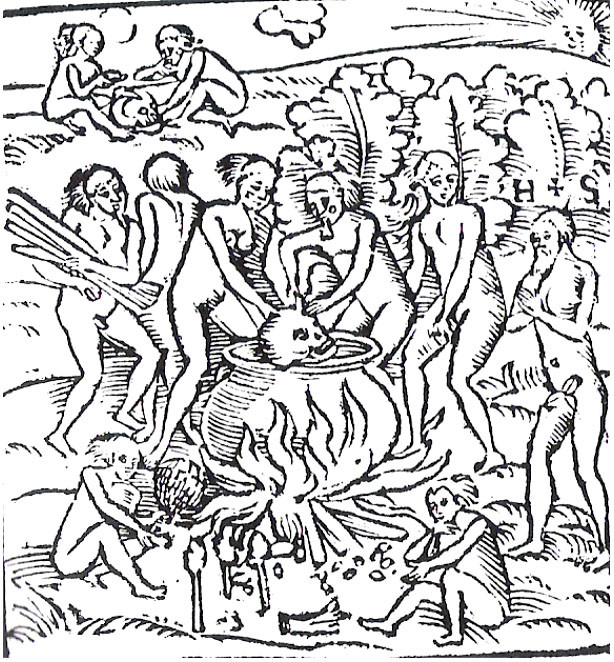
Original 1557 Hans Staden woodcut of the Tupinambá portrayed in a cannibalistic feast; Staden is the naked bearded man at right labeled "H+S"

After his return to Europe, the support of Dr. Johann Dryander in Marburg enabled Staden to publish an account of his captivity, entitled Warhaftige Historia und beschreibung eyner Landtschafft der Wilden Nacketen, Grimmigen Menschfresser-Leuthen in der Newenwelt America gelegen (True Story and Description of a Country of Wild, Naked, Grim, Man-eating People in the New World, America) (1557); the book was printed by Andreas Kolbe.

The Warhaftige Historia provided detailed descriptions of Tupinambá life and customs, illustrated by woodcuts. The book became an international bestseller and was translated into Latin and many other European languages, reaching a total of 76 editions. Theodor de Bry produced illustrative engravings of Staden's story for his book Grand Voyages to America (1593), volume 3.

== Work as a "go-between" ==
Though little is known about Staden outside of his written travel accounts, his writings proved that one way to find favor in a hostile setting was to establish oneself as a mediator between groups in a position known as a go-between. Go-betweens could mediate business or trade transactions between indigenous and European groups or translate language and culture. In captivity, Staden used his extensive knowledge of Tupinambá culture, religious veneration, and allegiance with the French to take on the role of a transactional go-between. As he had learned about South American indigenous culture and politics on a previous expedition, Staden first aimed to manipulate the Tupinambá into granting him his freedom. He first attempted to convince the Tupinambá that he was truly a Frenchman and an ally; when a French trader visited the group, however, and denied Staden's story, this method failed and Staden was forced to think of new ways to survive. He began to view himself in more nationalistic terms as a German, who could not rely on the Portuguese and French as Christian Europeans to save him. Staden quickly changed course and became an important transactional go-between who shared information of an anticipated attack by the Tupinambá's enemies, the Tupinikin. When the attack happened, the Tupinambá's trust in Staden grew. Staden also became a religious go-between. Staden attempted to deceive the Tupinambá tribe, convincing them that he had the ability to foresee future events and connect them with his Christian God's emotions. Staden repeatedly linked negative or dangerous circumstances, such as death and illness, with God's anger, telling the Tupinambá that God had been angered by their threats to kill and eat him. Furthermore, when another prisoner died, who had supported the idea of killing Staden, Staden used this as an example of God's anger towards those who lie about his nationality. Thus, once again, Staden falsely tried to claim he was a Frenchman in attempt to persuade the Tupinambá to free him. As the Tupinambá began to link their good fortunes with Staden's happiness, which apparently appeased God, and their misfortune with hostility to Staden, which apparently angered God, they began to trust his stories and value him within the tribe. As a captive of the Tupinambá, Staden relied heavily on his position as a go-between to gain favor and good will with them. Through excelling in this role he became an important asset to the group and despite constant threats of death, his life was spared. In 1555, Staden was finally able to make his escape and return to Europe.

== Cannibalism ==
The aspect of the book that received the most attention, from the time of publication up to the present, was cannibalism. Staden claimed that the Tupinambá were cannibals, gave vivid eyewitness accounts of the killing, preparing, and eating of war captives. According to one anecdote, the Tupinamba at one point gave him a delicious soup; after finishing his dinner, he found in the bottom of the cauldron some small skulls, which he later found out to be those of the boys in his choir.

Some scholars, such as anthropologist William Arens, have challenged the book's reliability, arguing that Staden invented its sensational accounts of cannibalism. Other scholars defend the book as an important and reliable ethnohistorical source on Brazil's indigenous population. Others note the significance of Staden in the study of Atlantic history.

== Later life ==
Staden died, in either Wolfhagen or Korbach, probably in 1579. The exact date of his death is unknown.

== Staden in film ==
- Hans Staden - Lá Vem Nossa Comida Pulando (Hans Staden - There He Comes, Our Food Jumping), a 1999 film, directed by Luis Alberto Pereira and spoken in the Tupi indigenous language (with subtitles in Portuguese, English, French and Spanish), explores his adventures while being held captive by the Tupinamba.
- Como Era Gostoso o meu Francês (How Tasty Was My Little Frenchman), a 1970 film, was based on Staden's stories (but did not include him as a character) and adds a subplot about the main character's love affair with a young native woman.

== Bibliography ==
=== Primary sources ===
- Staden, Hans (1557). Warhaftige Historia und beschreibung eyner Landtschafft der Wilden Nacketen, Grimmigen Menschfresser-Leuthen in der Newenwelt America gelegen. Marpurg: Kolb. Original German edition, 1557.
- Staden, Hans (1874). The Captivity of Hans Stade of Hesse, in A.D. 1547-1555, Among the Wild Tribes of Eastern Brazil. Translated by Albert Tootal. annotated by Richard F. Burton. The Hakluyt Society. English translation by the Hakluyt Society, 1874.
- Staden, Hans (2008). Hans Staden's True History: An Account of Cannibal Captivity in Brazil. Translated by Neil L. Whitehead; Michael Harbsmeier. Durham, NC: Duke University Press. ISBN 978-0-8223-4231-1. New English translation, 2008.

=== Secondary sources ===
- Arens, William (1979). The Man-Eating Myth: Anthropology and Anthropophagy. Oxford: Oxford University Press. ISBN 978-0-19-976344-3.
- Forsyth, Donald W.; Mark Haberlein (1985). "Three Cheers for Hans Staden: The Case for Brazilian Cannibalism". Ethnohistory. 32 (1): 17–36. doi:10.2307/482091. JSTOR 482091.
- Duffy, Eve M.; Metcalf, Alida C. (2011). The Return of Hans Staden: A Go-between in the Atlantic World. Baltimore: Johns Hopkins University Press. ISBN 978-1-4214-0421-9.
- Whitehead, Neil L.; Mark Haberlein (2000). "Hans Staden and the Cultural Politics of Cannibalism". Hispanic American Historical Review. 80 (40): 721–751. doi:10.1215/00182168-80-4-721. S2CID 145167648.
- Hemming, John (1978). Red Gold: The Conquest of the Brazilian Indians. Cambridge: Harvard University Press. ISBN 978-0-674-75107-1.
- Metcalf, Alida C. (2005). Go-betweens and the Colonization of Brazil, 1500–1600. Austin: University of Texas Press. ISBN 978-0-292-71276-8.
- Schmolz-Haberlein, Michaela; Mark Haberlein (2001). "Hans Staden, Neil L. Whitehead, and the Cultural Politics of Scholarly Publishing". Hispanic American Historical Review. 81 (3–4): 745–751. doi:10.1215/00182168-81-3-4-745.
- Tucker, Gene Rhea (2011). "The Discovery of Germany in America: Hans Staden, Ulrich Schmidel, and the Construction of a German Identity". Traversea: The Journal of Transatlantic History. 1 (1).
- Whitehead, Neil L.; Mark Haberlein (2000). "Hans Staden and the Cultural Politics of Cannibalism". Hispanic American Historical Review. 80 (40): 721–751. doi:10.1215/00182168-80-4-721. S2CID 145167648.
