= Charles Wagley =

American anthropologist

Charles Wagley (1913 – November 25, 1991) was an American anthropologist and leading pioneer in the development of Brazilian anthropology. Wagley began graduate work in the 1930s at Columbia University, where he fell under the spell of Franz Boas and what later became known as the "historical particularist” mode of anthropology.

Wagley completed his dissertation (Economics of a Guatemalan Village) in 1942, but had already begun exploring other field sites in Brazil. Along with Claude Lévi-Strauss, Wagley was one of the chief exponents in Brazilian anthropology.

During World War II, Wagley’s familiarity with Brazil’s agriculture industry led him to urge the US government to channel aid to Latin America to facilitate rubber production. During this time, he conducted long trips in the Amazon Basin, researching specifically among the Tapirapé of central Brazil and with the Tenetehara people in the eastern portion of the country.

Wagley returned to Columbia and took several key leadership roles. Also teaching in Columbia at the time was Julian Steward, another former student of Boas’ and whose idea of areal studies greatly impacted a new shift in American anthropology. Wagley would also become the director for the Latin American Institute at Columbia. He later left Columbia for an Emeritus position at the University of Florida, where he spearheaded the development of the Center for Tropical Conservation and Development. He was a member of both the American Philosophical Society and the American Academy of Arts and Sciences.

== Contributions ==
Wagley would borrow expound on the concept of area studies in an influential paper presented at one of the first social science meetings devoted to the Caribbean region. Titled “Plantation America: A Culture Sphere,” Wagley’s short paper sets forth a number of criteria used to establish varying “culture spheres” as frames of reference. The idea was central to redistributing area studies in the New World, and divided it up into three culture spheres: Euro-America, Indo-America, and Plantation-America.

The criteria Wagley used to categorize these spheres demonstrates a new research design in American anthropology. Taking into account geography, the environment, linguistic material, local and specific histories, and especially modes of production, Wagley belonged to a generation of academics which united British social anthropology and American cultural anthropology.

For the Caribbean, at least, this shift is important. Until then, British social science of the Caribbean and West Indies followed a modified version of structural-functionalism known as cultural pluralism. This theoretical stance had popular support among West Indian intellectuals and Independence movements, but was seen by others as a justification for racism between ethnic groups through the denial of class conflicts and class dynamics among ethnic groups. As a result, cultural pluralist thinkers were reluctant to consider modes of production or economic histories on par with social institutions such as marriage or religion. With the idea of “culture sphere,” the work of Wagley, along with Steward, Sidney Mintz, Eric Wolf, and others, helped construct a much more comparative approach for Caribbean studies.

In recent years, Wagley's 1959 paper on what he cleverly dubbed 'Social Race' has come to be recognised as a truly pioneering contribution to the comparative study of ethnoracial domination in the Americas. Wagley noted the variety of criteria around which 'races' were imagined across this vast region (variously stressing descent, appearance and social behaviour) and he showed how these different ideas of 'social race' correspond to divergent social structures: 'racial' groups could be found in the US where they sustained segregation. By contrast, in various Latin American contexts he identified race as a system for classifying individuals, and there race appeared more malleable a category than in the US.

== Published works ==
- Wagley, Charles. 1957. "Plantation America: A Culture Sphere," in Caribbean Studies, A Symposium edited by Vera Rubin, p. 3–13.
- Wagley, Charles. 1959. "On the Concept of Social Race in the Americas" in Actas del XXXIII Congreso Internacional de Americanistas, San Jose, 20–27 Julio 1958, Tomo 1. San Jose, Costa Rica: Lehman, p. 403–417. Reproduced in Contemporary Cultures and Societies of Latin America, Edited by Dwight B Heath & Richard Adams. New York: Random House.
- Wagley, Charles. 1963. An Introduction to Brazil. New York, Columbia University Press.
- Wagley, Charles. 1976. Amazon Town: A Study of Man in the Tropics. London, Oxford University Press.
- Wagley, Charles. 1977. Welcome of Tears: The Tapirapé Indians of Central Brazil. Waveland Press 1983. ISBN 978-0-88133-030-4.
