= Paul Moon =

New Zealand historian

Paul Moon ONZM
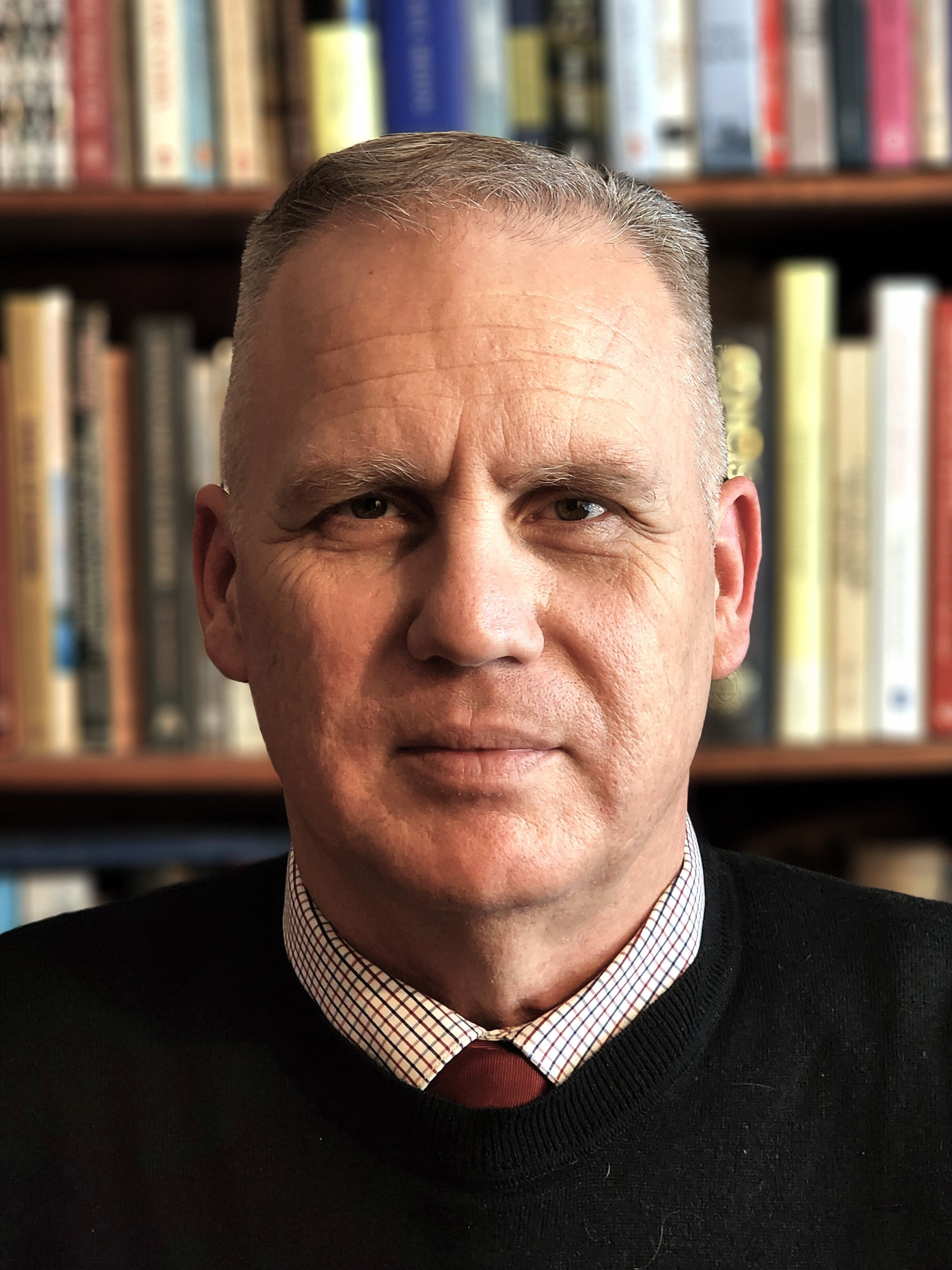
- Moon in 2024
- Born: Evan Paul Moon; 18 October 1968 (age 58); Auckland, New Zealand
- Occupations: Historian, author

Evan Paul Moon ONZM (born 18 October 1968) is a New Zealand historian and a professor at the Auckland University of Technology. He is a writer of New Zealand history and biography, specialising in Māori history, the Treaty of Waitangi and the early period of Crown rule.

== Education ==
Moon holds a Bachelor of Arts degree in history and political studies, a Master of Philosophy degree with distinction, a Master of Arts degree with honours, a PhD, and a Doctor of Literature degree. In 2003, he was elected as a Fellow of the Royal Historical Society at University College London, and is also a Fellow of the Royal Society of Arts.

== Career ==
Moon is recognised for his study of the Treaty of Waitangi, and has published two books on the topic. He has also produced the biographies of Governors William Hobson and Robert FitzRoy, and the Ngā Puhi chief Hōne Heke. In 2003, he published the book Tohunga: Hohepa Kereopa, an explication regarding tohunga of the Ngāi Tūhoe. He has also written a major biography of the Ngā Puhi politician and Kotahitanga leader Hōne Heke Ngāpua (1869–1909), and wrote Fatal Frontiers – a history of New Zealand in the 1830s. In addition to writing books, Moon is a frequent contributor to national and international academic journals on a variety of history-related topics.

Currently, Moon is professor of history at Auckland University of Technology's Te Ara Poutama, the Faculty of Māori Development, where he has taught since 1993.

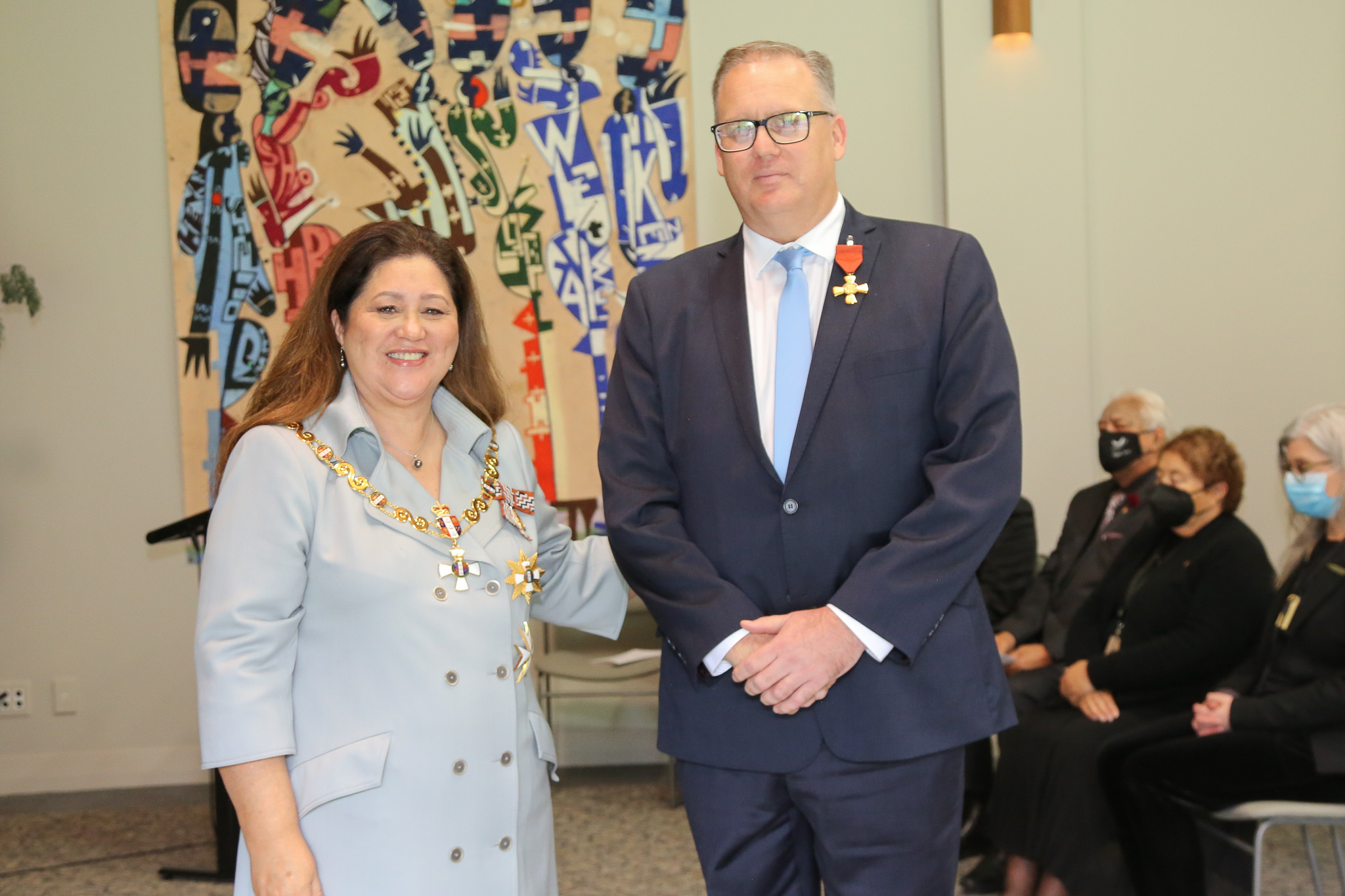
Moon (right), after his investiture as an Officer of the New Zealand Order of Merit by the governor-general, Dame Cindy Kiro, at Government House, Auckland, on 30 May 2022

In the 2022 New Year Honours, Moon was appointed an Officer of the New Zealand Order of Merit, for services to education and historical research.

== Media appearances ==
Moon has appeared on TVNZ's Frontier of Dreams programme explaining the history of the Waitangi Treaty, on Prime TV's New Zealand's Top 100 History Makers programme, on TVNZ's Close Up, Marae, Te Karere, and Waka Huia programmes, on TV3 News, on Sky News Australia, and on Māori Television as an election night analyst. He is a frequent commentator on Treaty-related issues on Radio New Zealand's Morning Report programme, on Newstalk ZB, Radio Pacific, and Radio Live.

== Controversies ==
=== Moon's criticism of Bishop Pompallier ===
Moon's 2001 biography of Hōne Heke caused a major controversy because of its treatment of Bishop Jean Baptiste Pompallier, whom Moon described as 'seditious' and 'treasonous' – a view fellow historian Michael King rejected as "Absolute nonsense...reflecting the anti-Catholic prejudices widespread among Protestant missionaries at the time".

=== Māori cannibalism ===
Moon's 2008 book This Horrid Practice, in which he discusses cannibalism amongst historical Māori, has also drawn criticism. It sparked accusations that Moon was demonising Māori, and some argued the book was "a return to Victorian values". Moon responded in a newspaper article in which he accused the critics of the book of attempting to censor him. He also was critical of some of the superficial commentaries made by particular academics, and noted that many people had criticised the book before it had even been released.

=== Heke's flagpole ===
In 2009 the auction firm Dunbar Sloane announced its intention to sell a piece of wood allegedly taken from the flagpole Hōne Heke chopped down at Russell in the mid-1840s. Moon was asked for a professional opinion and stated that the piece of wood was almost certainly a late nineteenth century fake. The item was withdrawn from auction, but sold privately to the Russell Museum later in the year for an undisclosed sum.

== Personal ==
=== Family ===
Moon was born in Auckland, the son of Evan Moon, a solicitor, and Dragica Moon (née Pavličević) who emigrated to New Zealand from Montenegro in 1966. His father's family came to New Zealand from Sussex, in the mid-1880s, and was involved in the establishment of the Auckland Star newspaper.

=== Religion ===
Moon identifies as a Christian, and in July 2007 completed a history of Three Kings Congregational Church, in Mt. Roskill, Auckland, for its centenary. Moon's wife, Milica, is Serbian Orthodox.

== Filmography ==
Year	Title	Role	Notes
2022	Sons and Heirs	Himself	Crime film

== Books ==
- Hobson: Governor of New Zealand 1840–1842. Auckland: David Ling Publishing. 1998. ISBN 0-908990-54-5.
- The Sealord Deal. Palmerston North: Campus Press. 1999. ISBN 1-877229-09-1.
- Muldoon: A Study in Public Leadership. Wellington: Pacific Press. 1999. ISBN 0-9583418-7-7.
- FitzRoy: Governor in Crisis 1843–1845. Auckland: David Ling Publishing. 2000. ISBN 0-908990-70-7.
- Hone Heke: Nga Puhi Warrior. Auckland: David Ling Publishing. 2001. ISBN 0-908990-76-6.
- Te Ara Ki Te Tiriti: The Path to the Treaty of Waitangi. Auckland: David Ling Publishing. 2002. ISBN 0-908990-83-9.
- Tohunga: Hohepa Kereopa. Auckland: David Ling Publishing. 2003. ISBN 0-908990-91-X.
- The Treaty and its Times 1840–1845. Auckland: Resource Books. 2004. ISBN 0-908618-18-2.
- A Tohunga's Natural World: Plants, Gardening, and Food. Auckland: David Ling Publishing. 2005. ISBN 1-877378-04-6.
- Ngapua: The Political Life of Hone Heke Ngapua, MHR. Auckland: David Ling Publishing. 2006. ISBN 1-877378-02-X.
- Fatal Frontiers: A New History of New Zealand in the Decade Before the Treaty. Auckland: Penguin Publishing. 2006. ISBN 0-14-302059-5.
- The Newest Country in the World: A History of New Zealand in the Decade of the Treaty. Auckland: Penguin Publishing. 2007. ISBN 978-0-14-300670-1.
- The Struggle for Tamaki Makaurau: Auckland to 1820. Auckland: David Ling Publishing. 2007. ISBN 978-1-877378-14-0.
- The Tohunga Journal: Hohepa Kereopa, Rua Kenana and Maungapohatu. Auckland: David Ling Publishing. 2008. ISBN 978-1-877378-20-1.
- This Horrid Practice: The Myth and the Reality of Traditional Māori Cannibalism. Auckland: Penguin. 2008. ISBN 978-0-14-300671-8.
- The Edges of Empires: New Zealand in the Middle of the Nineteenth Century. Auckland: David Ling Publishing. 2009. ISBN 978-1-877378-26-3.
- New Zealand Birth Certificates: 50 of New Zealand's Founding Documents. Auckland: AUT Press. 2010. ISBN 978-0-9582997-1-8.
- Victoria Cross at Takrouna: The Haane Manahi Story. Wellington: Huia Publishers. 2010. ISBN 978-1-86969-420-3.
- New Zealand in the Twentieth Century: The Nation, The People. Auckland: HarperCollins. 2011. ISBN 978-1-86950-804-3.
- Framing the World: The Life and Art of Augustus Earle. Auckland: Resource Books. 2011. ISBN 978-1-877431-44-9.
- A Savage Country: The Untold Story of New Zealand in the 1820s. Penguin Books (NZ). 2012. ISBN 978-0-143567387.
- Turning Points: Events that Changed the Course of New Zealand History. Auckland: New Holland Publishing. 2013. ISBN 9781869663797.
- Encounters: The Creation of New Zealand. A History. Auckland: Penguin Publishing. 2013. ISBN 9780143568506.
- The Voyagers: Remarkable European Explorations of New Zealand. Auckland: Penguin Publishing. 2014. ISBN 978-0-143-57055-4.
- Face to Face: Conversations with Remarkable New Zealanders. Auckland: Penguin Random House. 2015. ISBN 978-0-14-357144-5.
- Ka Ngaro Te Reo: Māori Language Under Siege in the 19th Century. Dunedin: Otago University Press. 2016. ISBN 978-1-927322-41-3.
- Killing Te Reo Māori: An Indigenous Language Facing Extinction. Palmerston North: Campus Press. 2018. ISBN 978-0-9941192-6-1.
- The Waikato: A History of New Zealand's Greatest River. Hamilton: Atuanui Press. 2018. ISBN 978-0-9941376-1-6.
- 'Against Truth': The Authenticity of a Propaganda Painting. Palmerston North: Campus Press. 2019. ISBN 978-0-9941398-7-0.
- Is There Honey Still For Tea? Fragments on the filming of a Dad's Army episode. Palmerston North: Campus Press. 2019. ISBN 978-0-9941398-7-0.
- When Darkness Stays: Hōhepa Kereopa and a Tūhoe Oral History. Auckland: David Ling Publishing. 2020. ISBN 978-1-927305-67-6.
- The Rise and Fall of James Busby: His Majesty's British Resident in New Zealand. London: Bloomsbury Publishing. 2020. ISBN 978-1-3501-1664-1.
- Colonising New Zealand: A Reappraisal. New York: Routledge. 2021. ISBN 978-0-3675-3423-3.
- Touring Edwardian New Zealand. Auckland: Batemans. 2022. ISBN 978-1-7768-9021-7.
- Auckland: The Twentieth-Century Story. Auckland: Oratia Media. 2023. ISBN 978-1-99-004235-5.
- A Draught of the South Land: Mapping New Zealand from Tasman to Cook. Cambridge, UK: The Lutterworth Press. 2023. ISBN 978-0-7188-9721-5.
- The Future of the Past: Why History Matters. A Short Introduction. Palmerston North: Campus Press. 2024. ISBN 978-0-9941192-5-4.
- Founding Documents of Aotearoa New Zealand: 50 Moments that Formed the Country. Auckland: Upstart Press. 2024. ISBN 978-1-77694080-6.
- Ans Westra: A Life in Photography. Auckland: Massey University Press. 2024. ISBN 978-1-99-101677-5.
- The Art of Colonisation: Images of Europe's Encounters with New Zealand. Auckland: Ugly Hill Press. 2026. ISBN 978-1-73858369-0.
- Like a Revolution: The Untold Story of Bob Jones & the New Zealand Party. Auckland: Upstart Press. 2026. ISBN 978-1-77694109-4.
