= This Horrid Practice =

2008 book on Māori cannibalism by Paul Moon

This Horrid Practice: The Myth and Reality of Traditional Maori Cannibalism
- Author: Paul Moon
- Language: English
- Publisher: Penguin NZ
- Publication date: 4 August 2008
- Publication place: New Zealand
- Pages: 304
- ISBN: 978-0-14-300671-8

This Horrid Practice: The Myth and Reality of Traditional Maori Cannibalism is a 2008 non-fiction book by New Zealand historian Paul Moon. The book is a comprehensive survey of the history of human cannibalism among the Māori of New Zealand. It was the first academic treatment of the subject published in New Zealand.

The title of the book is drawn from the 16 January 1770 journal entry of Captain James Cook, who, in describing acts of Māori cannibalism, stated "though stronger evidence of this horrid practice prevailing among the inhabitants of this coast will scarcely be required, we have still stronger to give."

== Contents ==
In five sections Moon describes: the European perspective on cannibalism in general during the 18th and 19th centuries; the evidence available from European observations of Māori cannibalism; the structure of cannibalism and its understanding within Māori society; the deliberate effort made by missionaries and British officials to abolish cannibalism; and the revisionist takes on cannibalism made in the 20th and 21st centuries (with particular focus on Gananath Obeyesekere's 2005 book Cannibal Talk: The Man-Eating Myth and Human Sacrifice in the South Seas).

== Post publication ==
Shortly after the book appeared, it was featured in numerous news reports and on the New Zealand television programme 60 Minutes. The publication of This Horrid Practice was controversial because of the book's determination that cannibalism was widespread among New Zealand Māori until the mid-19th century. Māori cannibalism is a sensitive topic in New Zealand, and Moon anticipated that the book would be negatively received by some.

The book prompted an anonymous but formal complaint to the New Zealand Human Rights Commission, arguing that it "describes the whole of Maori society as violent and dangerous. This is a clearly racist view claiming a whole ethnic group has these traits."

One of Moon's critics, Margaret Mutu, acknowledged that cannibalism was widespread throughout New Zealand but argued that Moon, as a Pākehā (non-Māori person), "did not understand the history of cannibalism and it was 'very, very hard for a Pakeha to get it right on these things'".

Moon responded by stating that Mutu had "condemned me and announced to the media that I did not understand the history of cannibalism, although she admitted to not having read even a single sentence of the book." Moon also charged his critics with attempted censorship and name-calling. He commented:

What amazes me is that the critics who say I don't understand the mechanisations of this practice often have not even read the book. Nor do they have evidence to the contrary. While they may not like its content, they can't deny historical fact. And trying to censor this book is denying the past.

Referring to the book, Dr Rawiri Taonui, New Zealand's first professor of Indigenous Studies, says about the author, "He's looked at no Maori language evidence, nothing from the Māori Land Court. He sets that all aside and makes a giant-sized conclusion about pre-European Maori society that's based on the view of a few Europeans".

== Book reviews ==
- Bevan-Smith, John. Review of This Horrid Practice: The Myth and Reality of Traditional Maori Cannibalism, by Paul Moon. New Zealand Journal of History, vol. 44 no. 2, 2010, p. 203-205. Project MUSE, https://muse.jhu.edu/article/879342.
