= Human cannibalism =

Practice of humans eating other humans

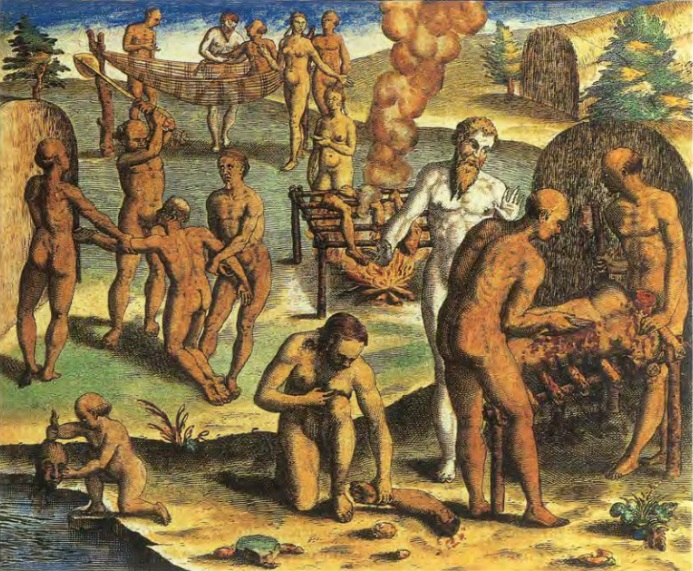
Enemies being killed and roasted by the Tupinambá in South America, watched by the naked German captive Hans Staden. Engraving by Theodor de Bry (1592).

Human cannibalism is the act or practice of humans eating the flesh or internal organs of other human beings. A person who practices cannibalism is called a cannibal. The meaning of "cannibalism" has been extended into zoology to describe animals consuming parts of individuals of the same species as food.

Anatomically modern humans, Neanderthals, and Homo antecessor are known to have practised cannibalism to some extent in the Pleistocene. Cannibalism was occasionally practised in Egypt during ancient and Roman times, as well as later during severe famines. The Island Caribs of the Lesser Antilles, whose name is the origin of the word cannibal, acquired a long-standing reputation as eaters of human flesh, reconfirmed when their legends were recorded in the 17th century.

Reports describing cannibal practices were most often recorded by outsiders and were especially during the colonialist epoch commonly used to justify the subjugation and exploitation of non-European peoples. Therefore, such sources need to be particularly critically examined before being accepted. A few scholars argue that no firm evidence exists that cannibalism has ever been a socially acceptable practice anywhere in the world, but such views have been largely rejected as irreconcilable with the actual evidence.

Cannibalism has been well documented in much of the world, including Fiji (once nicknamed the "Cannibal Isles"), the Amazon Basin, the Congo, and the Māori people of New Zealand. Cannibalism was also practised in New Guinea and in parts of the Solomon Islands, and human flesh was sold at markets in some parts of Melanesia and the Congo Basin. A form of cannibalism popular in early modern Europe was the consumption of body parts or blood for medical purposes. Reaching its height during the 17th century, this practice continued in some cases into the second half of the 19th century.

Cannibalism has occasionally been practised as a last resort by people suffering from famine. Well-known examples include the ill-fated Donner Party (1846–1847), the Holodomor (1932–1933), and the crash of Uruguayan Air Force Flight 571 (1972), after which the survivors ate the bodies of the dead. Additionally, there are cases of people engaging in cannibalism for sexual pleasure, such as Albert Fish, Issei Sagawa, Jeffrey Dahmer, and Armin Meiwes. Cannibalism has been both practised and fiercely condemned in several recent wars, especially in Liberia and the Democratic Republic of the Congo. Some reports suggest that it was still practised in Papua New Guinea around 2012, for cultural reasons.

Cannibalism has been said to test the bounds of cultural relativism because it challenges anthropologists "to define what is or is not beyond the pale of acceptable human behavior".

== Etymology ==
The word "cannibal" is derived from Spanish caníbal or caríbal, originally used as a name variant for the Kalinago (Island Caribs), a people from the West Indies said to have eaten human flesh. The older term anthropophagy, meaning "eating humans", is also used for human cannibalism.

== Reasons and types ==
Cannibalism has been practised under a variety of circumstances and for various motives. To adequately express this diversity, Shirley Lindenbaum suggests that "it might be better to talk about 'cannibalisms'" in the plural.

=== Institutionalized, survival, and pathological cannibalism ===
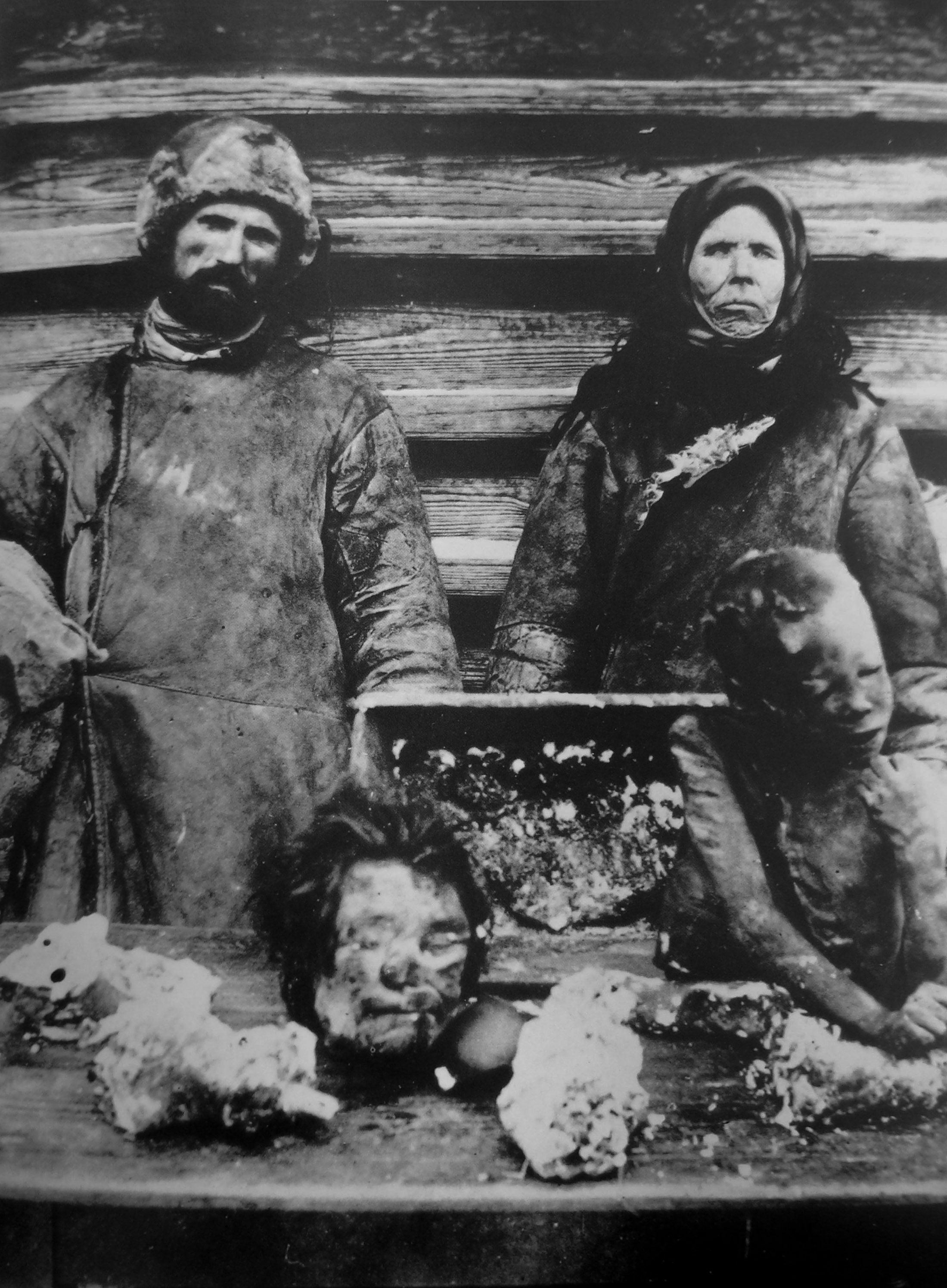
Survival cannibalism during the Russian famine of 1921–1922

One major distinction is whether cannibal acts are

- accepted by the culture in which they occur ("institutionalized cannibalism"),
- practised under starvation conditions to ensure one's immediate survival ("survival cannibalism"), or
- committed by isolated individuals considered criminal and often pathological by society at large ("cannibalism as psychopathology" or as "aberrant behavior").

Institutionalized cannibalism, sometimes also called "learned cannibalism", is the consumption of human body parts as "an institutionalized practice" generally accepted in the culture where it occurs.

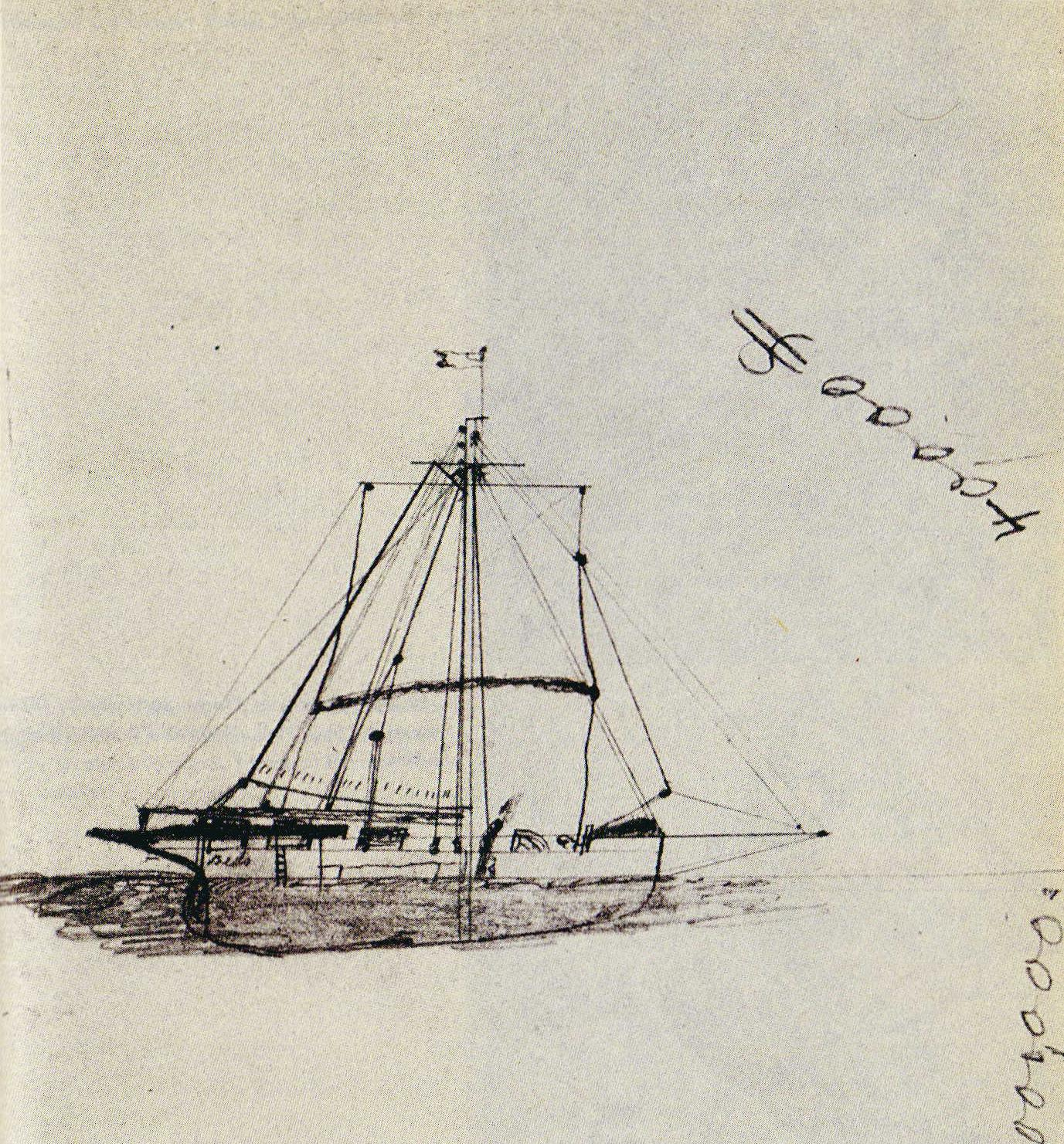
Sketch of the Mignonette by Tom Dudley. In English common law, the R v Dudley and Stephens (1884) case banned killing others to eat them after maritime disasters, which had been a widely accepted custom of the sea.

By contrast, survival cannibalism means "the consumption of others under conditions of starvation such as shipwreck, military siege, and famine, in which persons normally averse to the idea are driven [to it] by the will to live". Also known as famine cannibalism, such forms of cannibalism resorted to only in situations of extreme necessity have occurred in many cultures where cannibalism is otherwise clearly rejected. Survivors of the shipwrecks of the Essex and Méduse in the 19th century engaged in cannibalism, as did members of Franklin's lost expedition and the Donner Party, and, in the 20th century, survivors of the 1972 Andes flight disaster, who were stranded for 72 days in the Andes Mountains after their plane crashed while en route to Santiago, Chile.

Such cases often involve only necro-cannibalism (eating the corpse of someone already dead) as opposed to homicidal cannibalism (killing someone for food). In modern English law, the latter is always considered a crime, even in the most trying circumstances. The case of R v Dudley and Stephens, in which two men were found guilty of murder for killing and eating a cabin boy while adrift at sea in a lifeboat, set the precedent that necessity is no defence to a charge of murder. This decision outlawed and effectively ended the practice of shipwrecked sailors drawing lots in order to determine who would be killed and eaten to prevent the others from starving, a time-honoured practice that had been widely accepted in emergency situations.

In other cases, cannibalism is an expression of a psychopathology or mental disorder, condemned by the society in which it occurs and "considered to be an indicator of [a] severe personality disorder or psychosis". Well-known cases include Albert Fish, Issei Sagawa, and Armin Meiwes. Fantasies of cannibalism, whether acted out or not, are not specifically mentioned in manuals of mental disorders such as the DSM, presumably because at least serious cases (that lead to murder) are very rare.

=== Exo-, endo-, and autocannibalism ===
Within institutionalized cannibalism, exocannibalism is often distinguished from endocannibalism. Endocannibalism refers to the consumption of a person from the same community. Often it is a part of a funerary ceremony, similar to burial or cremation in other cultures. The consumption of the recently deceased in such rites can be considered "an act of affection" and a major part of the grieving process. It has also been explained as a way of guiding the souls of the dead into the bodies of living descendants.

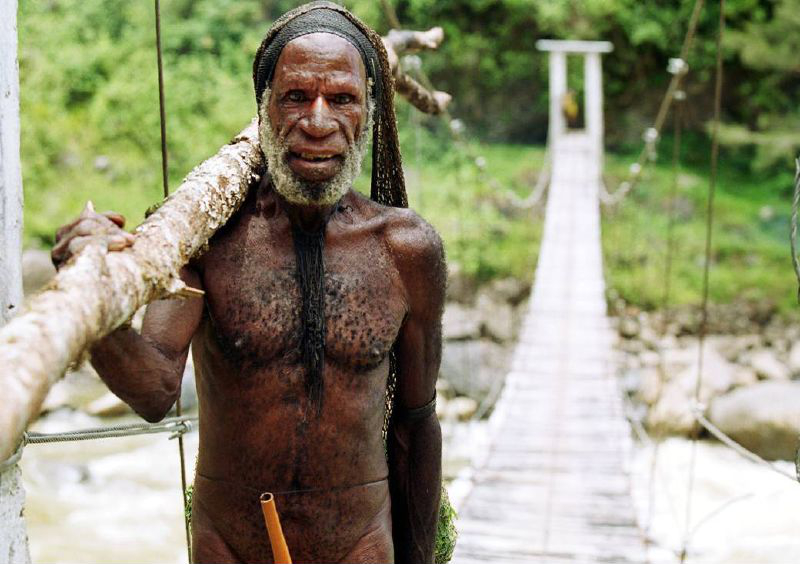
A Yali man from Western New Guinea. Historical accounts describe warfare-related cannibalism directed against enemies (exocannibalism) among the Yali, with reports of such practices continuing into the 1970s.

In contrast, exocannibalism is the consumption of a person from outside the community. It is frequently "an act of aggression, often in the context of warfare", where the flesh of killed or captured enemies may be eaten to celebrate one's victory over them.

Some scholars explain both types of cannibalism as due to a belief that eating a person's flesh or internal organs will endow the cannibal with some of the positive characteristics of the deceased. However, several authors investigating exocannibalism in New Zealand, New Guinea, and the Congo Basin observe that such beliefs were absent in these regions.

A further type, different from both exo- and endocannibalism, is autocannibalism (also called autophagy or self-cannibalism), "the act of eating parts of oneself". It does not ever seem to have been an institutionalized practice, but it occasionally occurs as pathological behaviour or due to other reasons such as curiosity. Also on record are instances of forced autocannibalism committed as acts of aggression, where individuals are forced to eat parts of their own bodies as a form of torture.

Exocannibalism is thus often associated with the consumption of enemies as an act of aggression, a practice also known as war cannibalism. Endocannibalism is often associated with the consumption of deceased relatives in funerary rites driven by affection — a practice known as funerary or mortuary cannibalism.

=== Additional motives ===
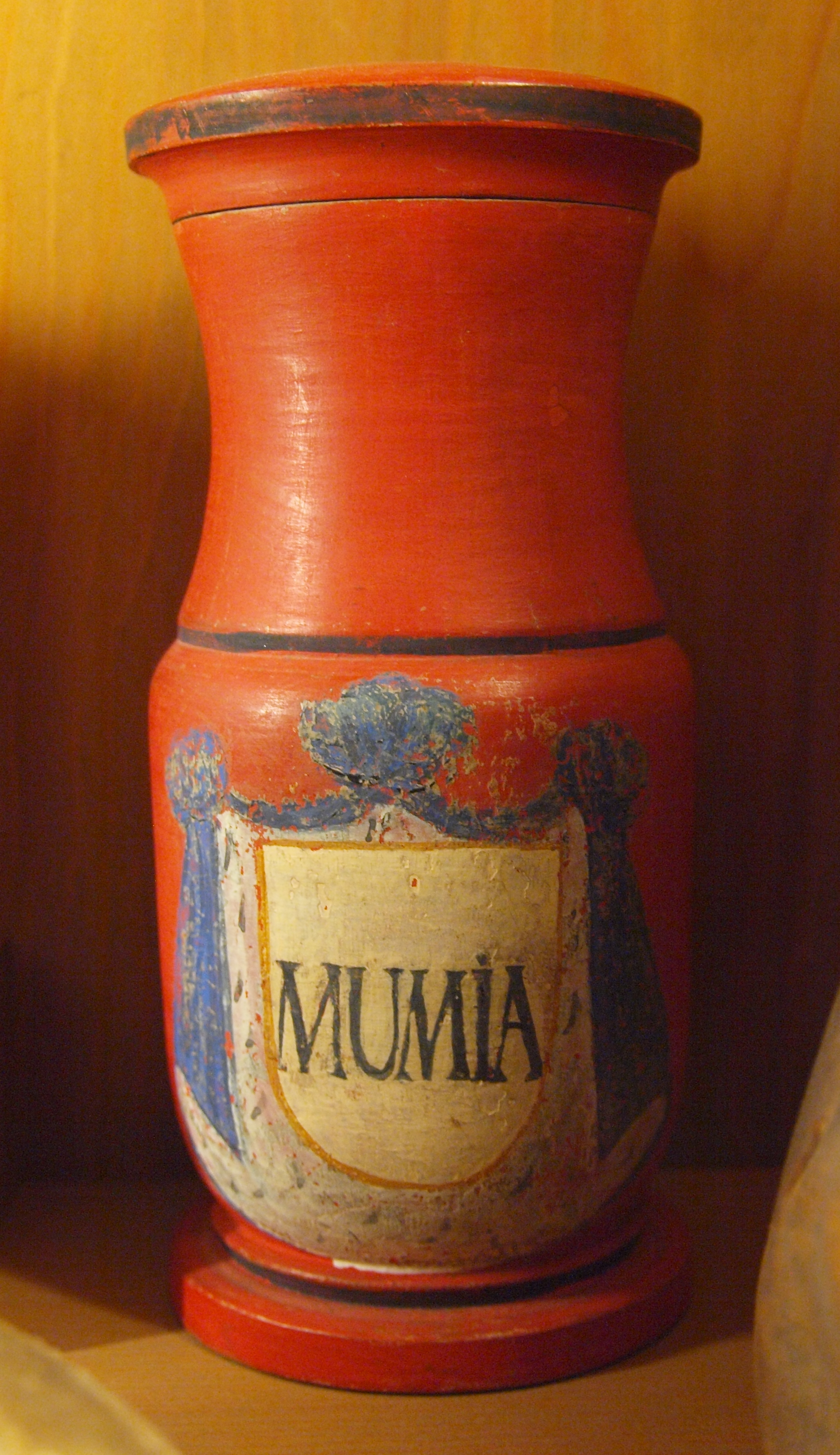
An 18th-century albarello used for storing mummia. Medicinal cannibalism was widespread in many countries of early modern Europe.

Medicinal cannibalism (also called medical cannibalism) means "the ingestion of human tissue ... as a supposed medicine or tonic". In contrast to other forms of cannibalism, which Europeans generally frowned upon, the "medicinal ingestion" of various "human body parts was widely practiced throughout Europe from the sixteenth to the eighteenth centuries", with early records of the practice going back to the first century CE. It was also frequently practised in China.

Sacrificial cannibalism refers the consumption of the flesh of victims of human sacrifice, for example among the Aztecs. Human and animal remains excavated in Knossos, Crete, have been interpreted as evidence of a ritual in which children and sheep were sacrificed and eaten together during the Bronze Age. According to Ancient Roman reports, the Celtic Druids in Britain practised sacrificial cannibalism, and archaeological evidence backing these claims has been found.

Infanticidal cannibalism or cannibalistic infanticide refers to cases where newborns or infants are killed because they are "considered unwanted or unfit to live" and then "consumed by the mother, father, both parents or close relatives". Infanticide followed by cannibalism was practised in various regions, but is particularly well documented among Aboriginal Australians. Among animals, such behaviour is called filial cannibalism, and it is common in many species, especially among fish.

Human predation is the hunting of people from unrelated and possibly hostile groups in order to eat them. In parts of the Southern New Guinea lowland rain forests, hunting people "was an opportunistic extension of seasonal foraging or pillaging strategies", with human bodies just as welcome as those of animals as sources of protein, according to the anthropologist Bruce M. Knauft. As populations living near coasts and rivers were usually better nourished and hence often physically larger and stronger than those living inland, they "raided inland 'bush' peoples with impunity and often with little fear of retaliation". Cases of human predation are also on record for the neighbouring Bismarck Archipelago and for Australia. In the Congo Basin, there lived groups such as the Bankutu who hunted humans for food even when game was plentiful.

The term innocent cannibalism has been used for cases of people eating human flesh without knowing what they are eating. It is a subject of myths, such as the myth of Thyestes who unknowingly ate the flesh of his own sons. There are also actual cases on record, for example from the Congo Basin, where cannibalism had been quite widespread and where even in the 1950s travellers were sometimes served a meat dish, learning only afterwards that the meat had been of human origin.

=== Gastronomic and functionalist explanations ===
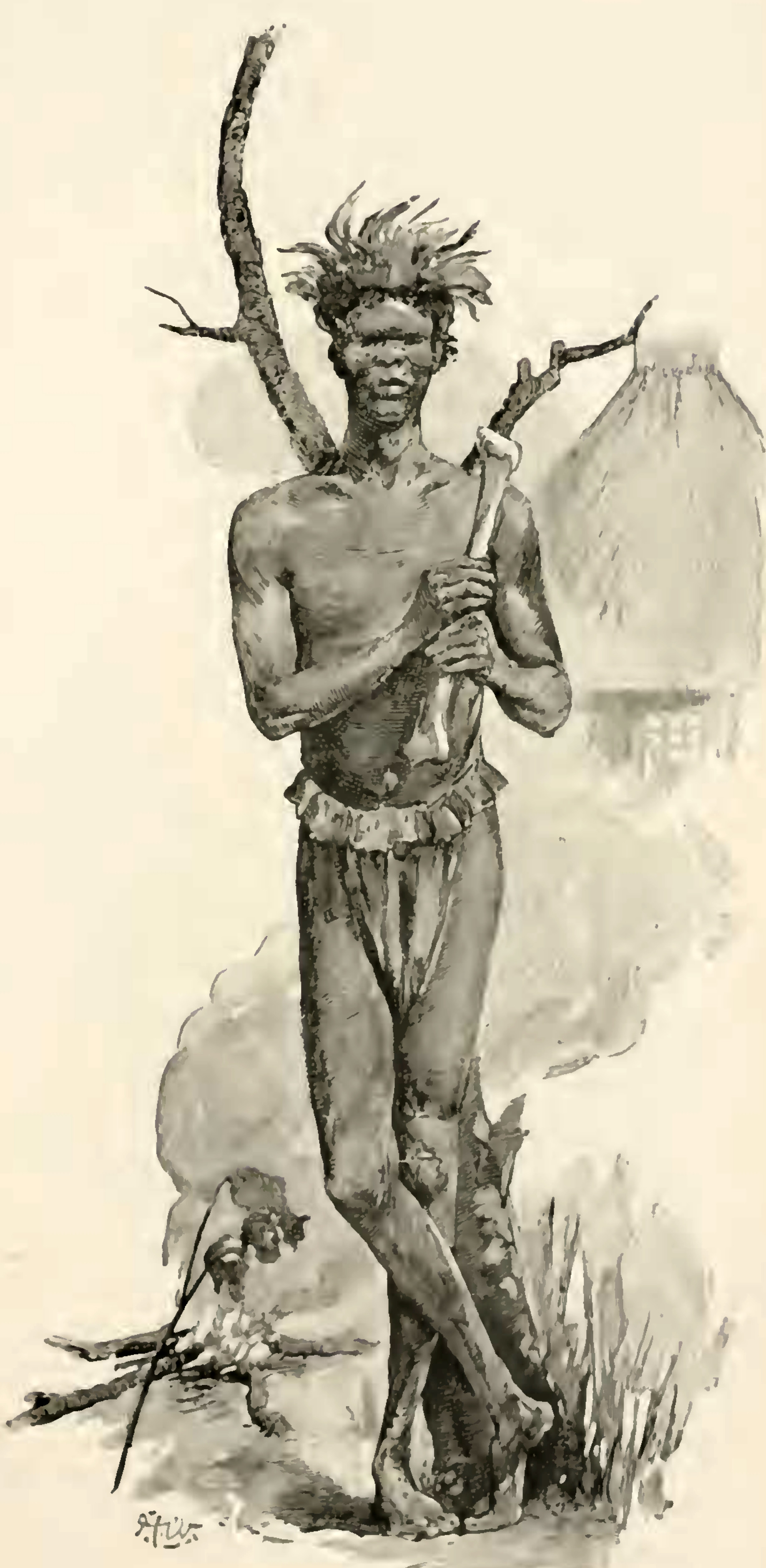
"A cannibal scene with human flesh roasting over the fire"— drawing from the Congo Basin by Herbert Ward (1891)

The term gastronomic cannibalism has been suggested for cases where human flesh is eaten to "provide a supplement to the regular diet"— thus essentially for its nutritional value — or, in an alternative definition, for cases where it is "eaten without ceremony (other than culinary), in the same manner as the flesh of any other animal". While the term has been criticized as being too vague to clearly identify a specific type of cannibalism, various records indicate that nutritional or culinary concerns could indeed play a role in such acts even outside of periods of starvation. Referring to the Congo Basin, where many of the eaten were butchered slaves rather than enemies killed in war, the anthropologist Emil Torday notes that "the most common [reason for cannibalism] was simply gastronomic: the natives loved 'the flesh that speaks' [as human flesh was commonly called] and paid for it". The historian Key Ray Chong observes that, throughout Chinese history, "learned cannibalism was often practiced ... for culinary appreciation".

Jared Diamond suggests in Guns, Germs, and Steel that "protein starvation is probably also the ultimate reason why cannibalism was widespread in traditional New Guinea highland societies", and both in New Zealand and Fiji, cannibals explained their acts as due to a lack of animal meat. In Liberia, a former cannibal argued that it would have been wasteful to let the flesh of killed enemies spoil, and eaters of human flesh in New Guinea and the neighbouring Bismarck Archipelago expressed the same sentiment.

In many cases, human flesh was also described as particularly delicious, especially when it came from women, children, or both. Such statements are on record for various regions and peoples, including the Aztecs, Liberia and Nigeria, the Fang people in west-central Africa, the Congo Basin, China up to the 14th century, Sumatra, Borneo, Australia, New Guinea, New Zealand, Vanuatu, and Fiji. Some Europeans and Americans who ate human flesh accidentally, out of curiosity, or to comply with local customs likewise tended to describe it as very good.

There is a debate among anthropologists on how important functionalist reasons are for the understanding of institutionalized cannibalism. Diamond is not alone in suggesting "that the consumption of human flesh was of nutritional benefit for some populations in New Guinea" and the same case has been made for other "tropical peoples ... exploiting a diverse range of animal foods", including human flesh. The materialist anthropologist Marvin Harris argued that a "shortage of animal protein" was also the underlying reason for Aztec cannibalism. The cultural anthropologist Marshall Sahlins, on the other hand, rejected such explanations as overly simplistic, stressing that cannibal customs must be regarded as "complex phenomen[a]" with "myriad attributes" which can only be understood if one considers "symbolism, ritual, and cosmology" in addition to their "practical function".

In pre-modern medicine, an explanation given by the now-discredited theory of humorism for cannibalism was that it was caused by a black acrimonious humor, which, being lodged in the linings of the ventricles of the heart, produced a voracity for human flesh. On the other hand, the French philosopher Michel de Montaigne understood war cannibalism as a way of expressing vengeance and hatred towards one's enemies and celebrating one's victory over them, thus giving an interpretation that is close to modern explanations. He also pointed out that some acts of Europeans in his own time could be considered as equally barbarous, making his essay "Of Cannibals" (c. 1580) a precursor to later ideas of cultural relativism.

== Body parts and culinary practices ==
=== Nutritional value of the human body ===
Archaeologist James Cole investigated the nutritional value of the human body and found it to be similar to that of animals of similar size. He notes that, according to ethnographic and archaeological records, nearly all edible parts of humans were sometimes eaten – not only skeletal muscle tissue ("flesh" or "meat" in a narrow sense), but also "lungs, liver, brain, heart, nervous tissue, bone marrow, genitalia and skin", as well as kidneys. For a typical adult man, the combined nutritional value of all these edible parts is about 126,000 kilocalories (kcal). The nutritional value of women and younger individuals is lower because of their lower body weight – for example, around 86% of a male adult for an adult woman and 30% for a boy aged around 5 or 6.

As the daily energy need of an adult man is about 2,400 kilocalories, a dead male body could thus have fed a group of 25 men for a bit more than two days, provided they ate nothing but the human flesh alone – longer if it was part of a mixed diet. The nutritional value of the human body is thus not insubstantial, though Cole notes that for prehistoric hunters, large megafauna such as mammoths, rhinoceros, and bison would have been an even better deal as long as they were available and could be caught, because of their much higher body weight.

=== Hearts and livers ===
Cases of people eating human livers and hearts, especially of enemies, have been reported from across the world. After the Battle of Uhud (625), Hind bint Utba ate (or at least attempted to) the liver of Hamza ibn Abd al-Muttalib, an uncle of Muhammad. At that time, the liver was considered "the seat of life". French Catholics ate livers and hearts of Huguenots at the St. Bartholomew's Day massacre in 1572, in some cases also offering them for sale.

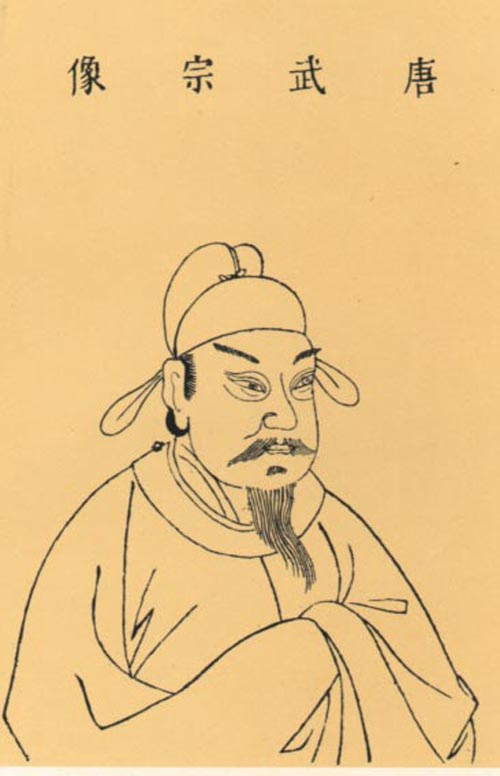
Emperor Wuzong of Tang supposedly ate hearts and livers of teenagers to cure his illness

In China, medical cannibalism was practised over centuries. People voluntarily cut their own body parts, including parts of their livers, and boiled them to cure ailing relatives. Children were sometimes killed because eating their boiled hearts was considered a good way of extending one's life. Emperor Wuzong of Tang supposedly ordered provincial officials to send him "the hearts and livers of fifteen-year-old boys and girls" when he had become seriously ill, hoping in vain that this folk "medicine" would cure him. Later, private individuals sometimes followed his example, paying soldiers who kidnapped preteen children for their kitchen.

When "human flesh and organs were sold openly at the marketplace" during the Taiping Rebellion in 1850–1864, human hearts became a popular dish, according to some who afterwards freely admitted having consumed them. According to a missionary's report from the brutal suppression of the Dungan Revolt of 1895–1896 in northwestern China, "thousands of men, women and children were ruthlessly massacred by the imperial soldiers" and "many a meal of human hearts and livers was partaken of by soldiers", supposedly out of a belief that this would give them "the courage their enemies had displayed".

In World War II, Japanese soldiers ate the livers of killed Americans in the Chichijima incident. Many Japanese soldiers who died during the occupation of Jolo Island in the Philippines had their livers eaten by local Moro fighters, according to Japanese soldier Fujioka Akiyoshi.

During the Cultural Revolution (1966–1976), hundreds of incidents of cannibalism occurred, mostly motivated by hatred against supposed "class enemies", but sometimes also by health concerns. In a case recorded by the local authorities, a school teacher in Mengshan County "heard that consuming a 'beauty's heart' could cure disease". He then chose a 13- or 14-year-old student of his and publicly denounced her as a member of the enemy faction, which was enough to get her killed by an angry mob. After the others had left, he "cut open the girl's chest ..., dug out her heart, and took it home to enjoy". In a further case that took place in Wuxuan County, likewise in the Guangxi region, three brothers were beaten to death as supposed enemies; afterwards their livers were cut out, baked, and consumed "as medicine". According to the Chinese writer Zheng Yi, who researched these events, "the consumption of human liver was mentioned at least fifty or sixty times" in just a small number of archival documents. He talked with a man who had eaten human liver and told him that "barbecued liver is delicious".

During a massacre of the Madurese minority in the Indonesian part of Borneo in 1999, reporter Richard Lloyd Parry met a young cannibal who had just participated in a "human barbecue" and told him without hesitation: "It tastes just like chicken. Especially the liver – just the same as chicken." In 2013, during the Syrian civil war, Syrian rebel Abu Sakkar was filmed eating parts of the lung or liver of a government soldier while declaring that "We will eat your hearts and your livers you soldiers of Bashar the dog".

=== Breasts, palms, and soles ===
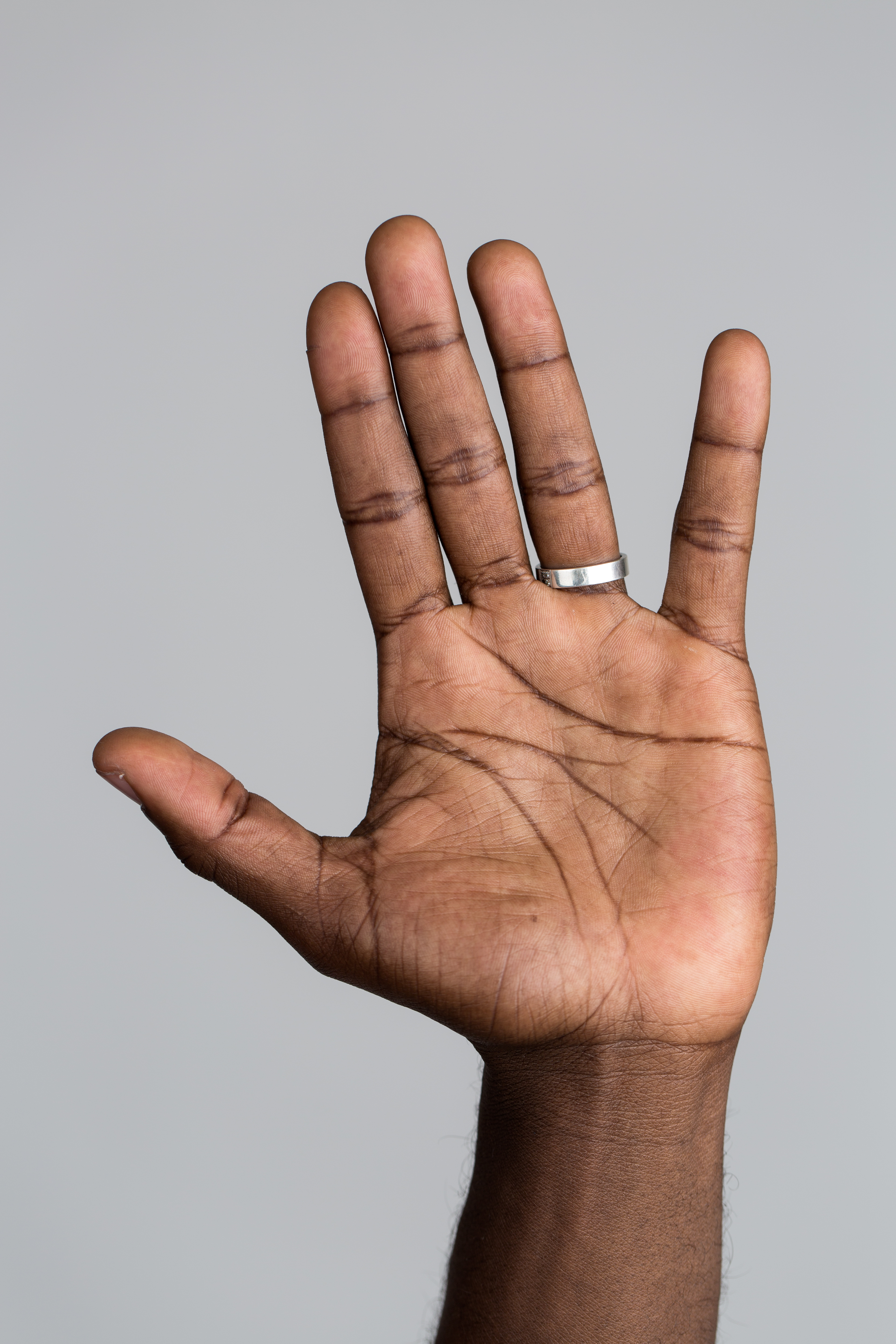
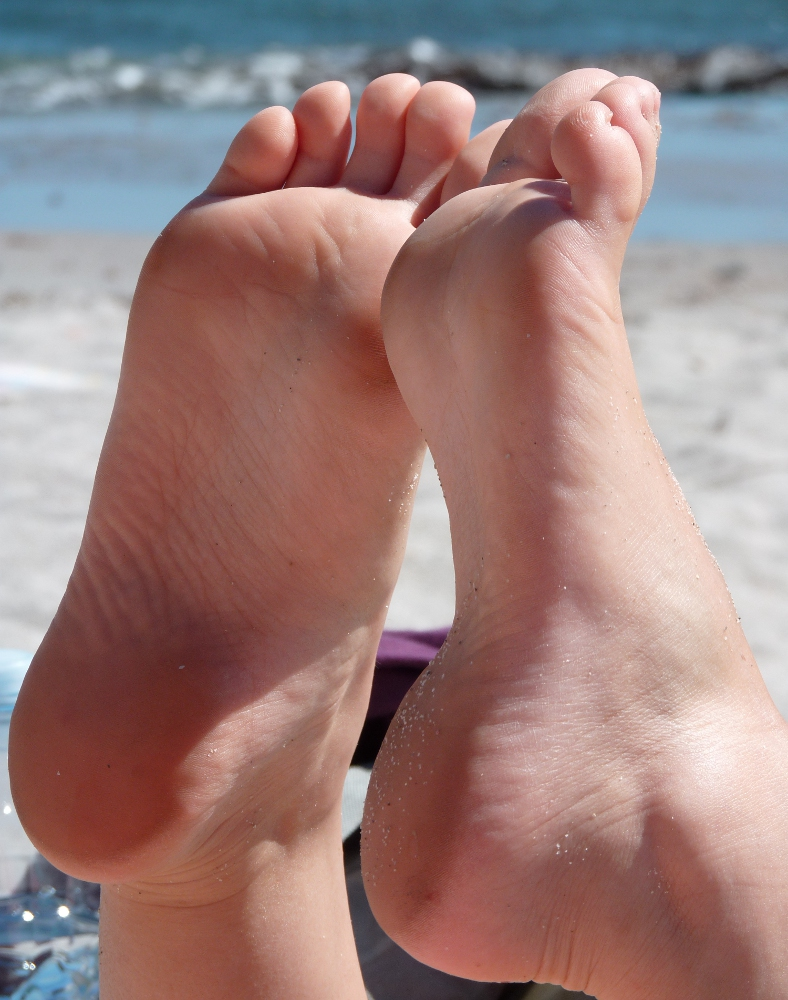
Human palms and soles were reportedly favoured for eating in various parts of the world

Various accounts from around the world mention women's breasts as a favourite body part. Also frequently mentioned are the palms of the hands and sometimes the soles of the feet, regardless of the victim's gender.

Jerome, in his treatise Against Jovinianus, claimed that the British Attacotti were cannibals who regarded the buttocks of men and the breasts of women as delicacies. During the Mongol invasion of Europe in the 13th century and their subsequent rule over China during the Yuan dynasty (1271–1368), some Mongol fighters practised cannibalism and both European and Chinese observers record a preference for women's breasts, which were considered "delicacies" and, if there were many corpses, sometimes the only part of a female body that was eaten (of men, only the thighs were said to be eaten in such circumstances).

After meeting a group of cannibals in West Africa in the 14th century, the Moroccan explorer Ibn Battuta recorded that, according to their preferences, "the tastiest part of women's flesh is the palms and the breast." Centuries later, the anthropologist Percy Amaury Talbot wrote that, in southern Nigeria, "the parts in greatest favour are the palms of the hands, the fingers and toes, and, of a woman, the breast." Regarding the north of the country, his colleague Charles Kingsley Meek added: "Among all the cannibal tribes the palms of the hands and the soles of the feet were considered the tit-bits of the body." Among the Apambia, a cannibalistic clan of the Azande people in Central Africa, palms and soles were considered the best parts of the human body, while their favourite dish was prepared with "fat from a woman's breast", according to the missionary and ethnographer F. Gero.

Similar preferences are on record throughout Melanesia. According to the anthropologists Bernard Deacon and Camilla Wedgwood, women were "specially fattened for eating" in Vanuatu, "the breasts being the great delicacy". A missionary confirmed that "a body of a female usually formed the principal part of the repast" at feasts for chiefs and warriors. The ethnologist Felix Speiser writes: "Apart from the breasts of women and the genitals of men, palms of hands and soles of feet were the most coveted morsels." He knew a chief on Ambae, one of the islands of Vanuatu, who, "according to fairly reliably sources", dined on a young girl's breasts every few days. When visiting the Solomon Islands in the 1980s, anthropologist Michael Krieger met a former cannibal who told him that women's breasts had been considered the best part of the human body because they were so fatty, with fat being a rare and sought delicacy. They were also considered among the best parts in Fiji, New Guinea, and the Bismarck Archipelago.

=== Modes of preparation ===
Based on theoretical considerations, the structuralist anthropologist Claude Lévi-Strauss suggested that human flesh was most typically boiled, with roasting also used to prepare the bodies of enemies and other outsiders in exocannibalism, but rarely in funerary endocannibalism (when eating deceased relatives). But an analysis of 60 sufficiently detailed and credible descriptions of institutionalized cannibalism by anthropologist Paul Shankman failed to confirm this hypothesis. Shankman found that roasting and boiling together accounted for only about half of the cases, with roasting being slightly more common. In contrast to Lévi-Strauss's predictions, boiling was more often used in exocannibalism, while roasting was about equally common for both.

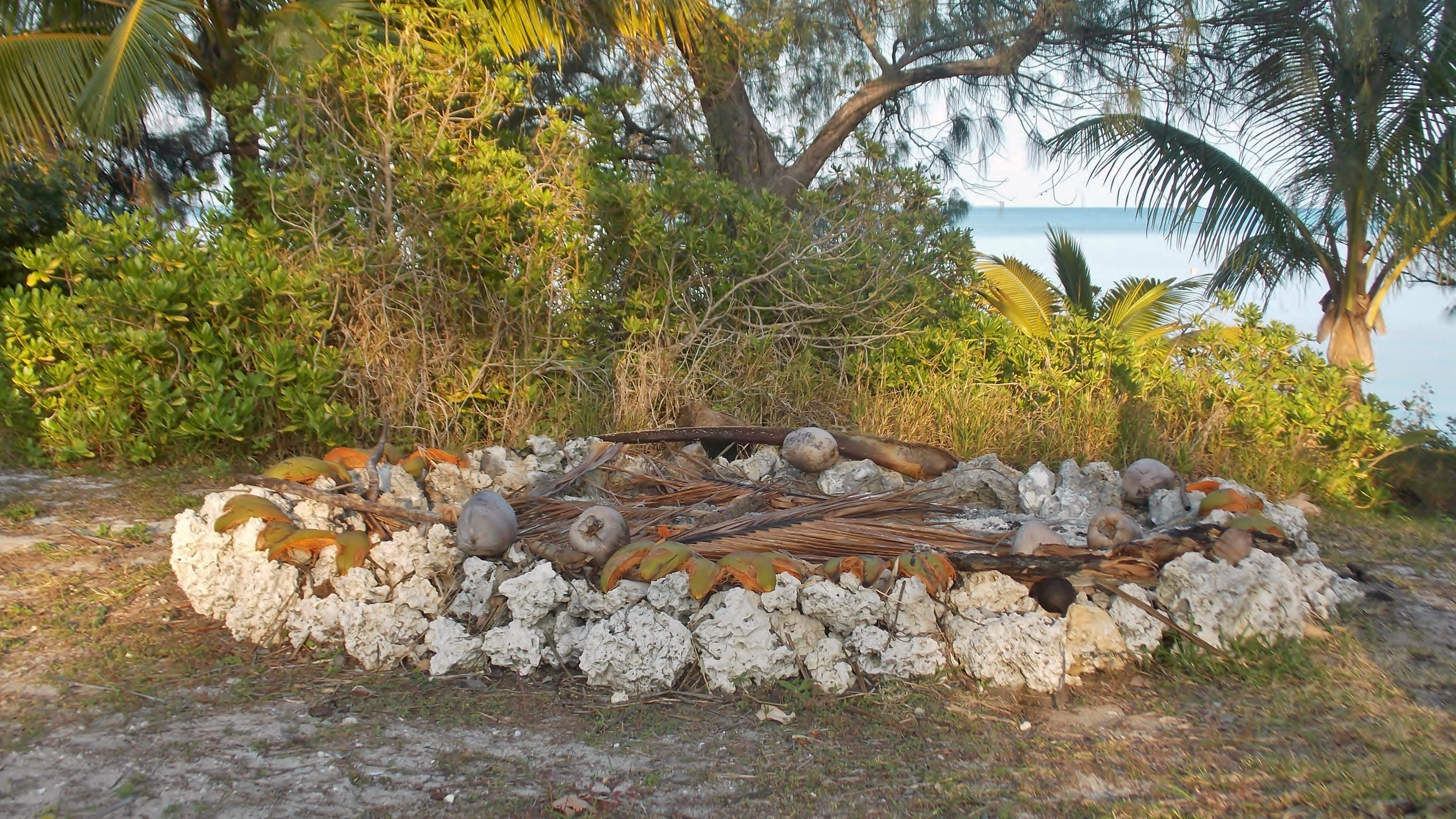
Earth oven in New Caledonia, Melanesia

Shankman observed that various other "ways of preparing people" were repeatedly employed as well; in one third of all cases, two or more modes were used together (e.g. some bodies or body parts were boiled or baked, while others were roasted). Human flesh was baked in steam on preheated rocks or in earth ovens (a technique widely used in the Pacific), smoked (which allowed to preserve it for later consumption), or eaten raw. While these modes were used in both exo- and endocannibalism, another method that was only used in the latter and only in the Americas was to burn the bones or bodies of deceased relatives and then to consume the bone ash.

After analysing numerous accounts from China, Key Ray Chong similarly concludes that "a variety of methods for cooking human flesh" were used in this country. Most popular were "broiling, roasting, boiling and steaming", followed by "pickling in salt, wine, sauce and the like". Human flesh was also often "cooked into soup" or stewed in cauldrons. Eating human flesh raw was the "least popular" method, but a few cases are on record too. Chong notes that human flesh was typically cooked in the same way as "ordinary foodstuffs for daily consumption" – no principal distinction from the treatment of animal meat is detectable, and nearly any mode of preparation used for animals could also be used for people.

=== Whole-body roasting and baking ===
Though human corpses, like those of animals, were usually cut into pieces for further processing, reports of people being roasted or baked whole are on record throughout the world. At the archaeological site of Herxheim, Germany, more than a thousand people were killed and eaten about 7000 years ago, and the evidence indicates that many of them were spit-roasted whole over open fires.

During severe famines in China and Egypt during the 12th and early 13th centuries, there was a black-market trade in corpses of little children that were roasted or boiled whole. In China, human-flesh sellers advertised such corpses as good for being boiled or steamed whole, "including their bones", and praised their particular tenderness. In Cairo, Egypt, the Arab physician Abd al-Latif al-Baghdadi repeatedly saw "little children, roasted or boiled", offered for sale in baskets on street corners during a heavy famine that started in 1200 CE. Older children and possibly adults were sometimes prepared in the same way. Once he saw "a child nearing the age of puberty, who had been found roasted"; two young people confessed to having killed and cooked the child. Another time, remains were found of a person who had apparently been roasted and served whole, the legs tied like those of "a sheep trussed for cooking". Only the skeleton was found, still undivided and in the trussed position, but "with all the flesh stripped off for food".

In some cases children were roasted and offered for sale by their own parents; other victims were street children, who had become very numerous and were often kidnapped and cooked by people looking for food or extra income. The victims were so numerous that sometimes "two or three children, even more, would be found in a single cooking pot." Al-Latif notes that, while initially people were shocked by such acts, they "eventually ... grew accustomed, and some conceived such a taste for these detestable meats that they made them their ordinary provender ... The horror people had felt at first vanished entirely".

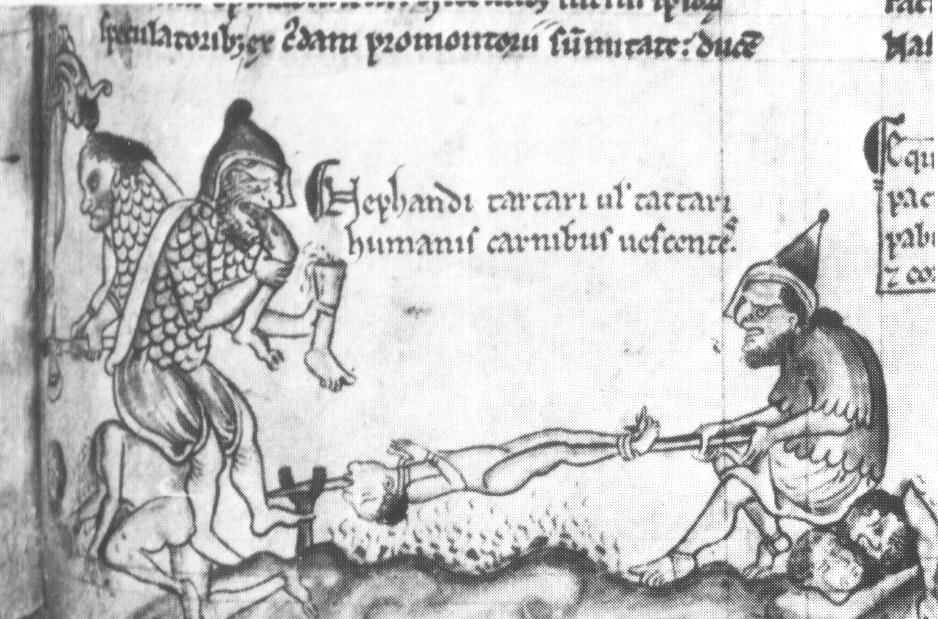
Depiction of Mongol cannibalism from the Chronica Majora

After the end of the Mongol-led Yuan dynasty (1271–1368), a Chinese writer criticized in his recollections of the period that some Mongol soldiers ate human flesh because of its taste rather than (as had also occurred in other times) merely in cases of necessity. He added that they enjoyed torturing their victims (often children or women, whose flesh was preferred over that of men) by roasting them alive, in "large jars whose outside touched the fire [or] on an iron grate". Other victims were placed "inside a double bag ... which was put into a large pot" and so boiled alive. While not mentioning live roasting or boiling, European authors also complained about cannibalism and cruelty during the Mongol invasion of Europe, and a drawing in the Chronica Majora (compiled by Matthew Paris) shows Mongol fighters spit-roasting a human victim.

Pedro de Margarit, who accompanied Christopher Columbus during his second voyage, afterwards stated "that he saw there with his own eyes several Indians skewered on spits being roasted over burning coals as a treat for the gluttonous." Jean de Léry, who lived for several months among the Tupinambá in Brazil, writes that several of his companions reported "that they had seen not only a number of men and women cut in pieces and grilled on the boucans, but also little unweaned children roasted whole" after a successful attack on an enemy village.

According to German ethnologist Leo Frobenius, children captured by Songye slave raiders in the Central African Kasaï region that were too young to be sold with a profit were instead "skewered on long spears like rats and roasted over a quickly kindled large fire" for consumption by the raiders.

In the Solomon Islands in the 1870s, a British captain saw a "dead body, dressed and cooked whole" offered for sale in a canoe. A settler treated the scene as "an every-day occurrence" and told him "that he had seen as many as twenty bodies lying on the beach, dressed and cooked". Decades later, a missionary reported that whole bodies were still offered "up and down the coast in canoes for sale" after battles, since human flesh was eaten "for pleasure".

In Fiji, whole human bodies cooked in earth ovens were served in carefully pre-arranged postures, according to anthropologist Lorimer Fison and several other sources:

The limbs having been arranged in the posture which it is intended they shall assume, banana leaves are wrapped round them to prevent the flesh falling off in the possible event of over-baking.... A hole of sufficient size is then dug in the earth, and filled with dry wood, which is set on fire. When it is well kindled, a number of stones, about the size of a man's fist, are thrown into it; and when the firewood is burnt down to a mass of glowing embers, some of the heated stones are lifted nimbly by tongs made of bent withes, and thrust within the dead man's body.... Presently the mound swells and rises; little cracks appear, whence issue jets of steam diffusing a savoury odour; and in due time, of which the Fijians are excellent judges, the culinary process is complete. The earth is then cautiously removed, the body lifted out, its wrappings taken off, its face painted, a wig or a turban placed upon its head, and there we have a "trussed frog" [as such steamed corpses were called] in all its unspeakable hideousness, staring at us with wide open, prominent, lack-lustre eyes. There is no burning or roasting: the body is cooked in its own steam, and the features are so little disturbed by the process that the dead man can almost always be recognised by those who knew him when he was alive.

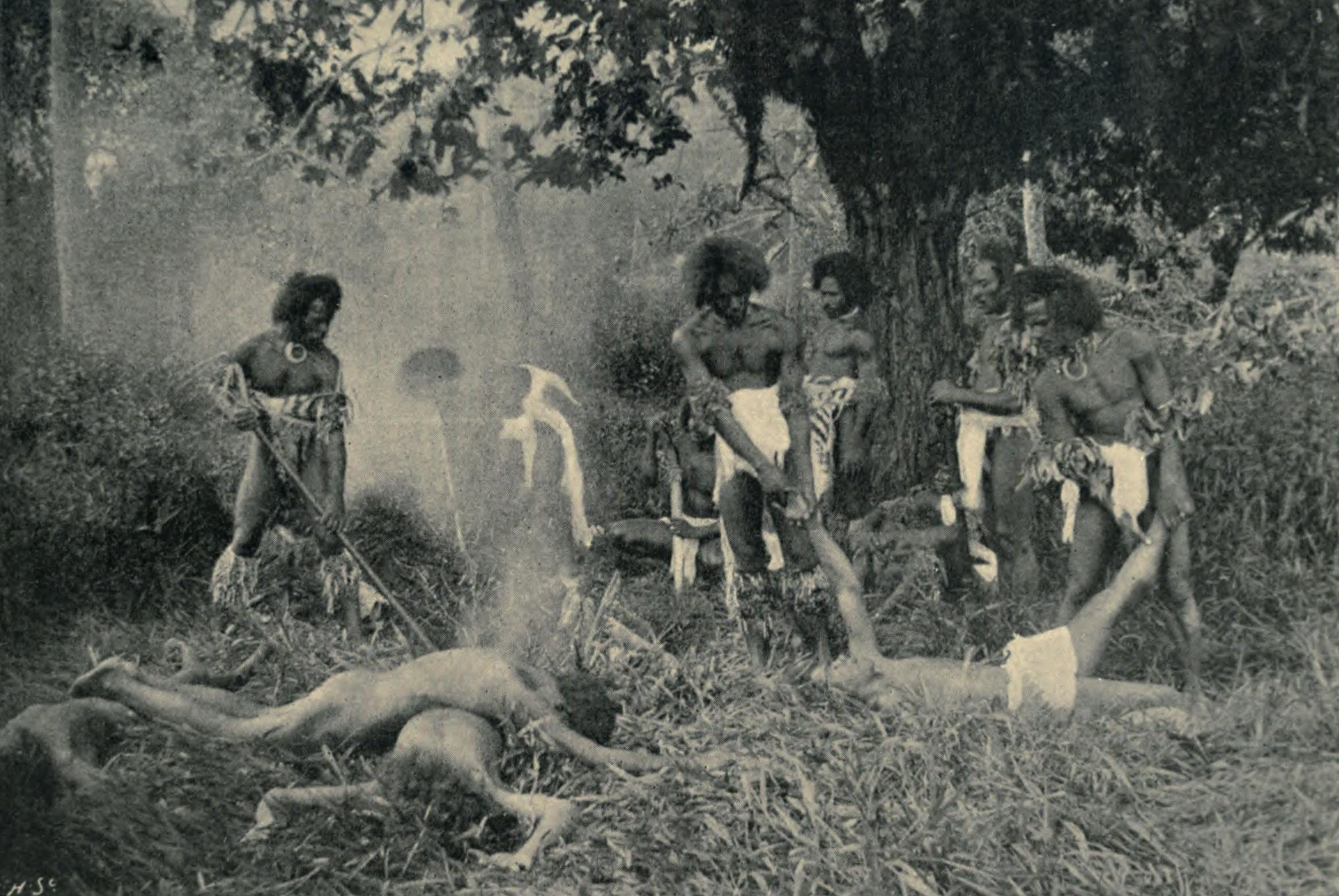
A re-enactment from c. 1895 of a cannibal feast reported to have occurred in Fiji in 1869

Within this archipelago, it was especially the Gau Islanders who "were famous for cooking bodies whole".

In New Caledonia, a missionary named Ta'unga from the Cook Islands repeatedly saw how whole human bodies were cooked in earth ovens: "They tie the hands together and bundle them up together with the intestines. The legs are bent up and bound with hibiscus bark. When it is completed they lay the body out flat on its back in the earth oven, then when it is baked ready they cut it up and eat it." Ta'unga commented: "One curious thing is that when a man is alive he has a human appearance, but after he is baked he looks more like a dog, as the lips are shriveled back and his teeth are bared."

Among the Māori in New Zealand, children captured in war campaigns were sometimes spit-roasted whole (after slitting open their bellies to remove the intestines), as various sources report. Enslaved children, including teenagers, could meet the same fate, and whole babies were sometimes served at the tables of chiefs.

In the Marquesas Islands, captives (preferably women) killed for consumption "were spitted on long poles that entered between their legs and emerged from their mouths" and then roasted whole. Similar customs had a long history: In Nuku Hiva, the largest of these islands, archaeologists found the partially consumed remains of a young child that had been roasted whole in an earth oven during the 14th century or earlier.

While a stereotype of cannibalism depicts the boiling of whole persons – often missionaries – in giant pots, this does not reflect reality. Human flesh was sometimes boiled in (normal-sized) pots, but whole human bodies rarely were.

== Medical aspects ==
A well-known case of mortuary cannibalism is that of the Fore tribe in New Guinea, which resulted in the spread of the prion disease kuru. Although the Fore's mortuary cannibalism was well-documented, the practice had ceased before the cause of the disease was recognized. However, some scholars argue that although post-mortem dismemberment was the practice during funeral rites, cannibalism was not. Marvin Harris theorizes that it happened during a famine period coincident with the arrival of Europeans and was rationalized as a religious rite.

In 2003, a publication in Science received a large amount of press attention when it suggested that early humans may have practised extensive cannibalism. According to this research, genetic markers commonly found in modern humans worldwide suggest that today many people carry a gene that evolved as protection against the brain diseases that can be spread by consuming human brain tissue. A 2006 reanalysis of the data questioned this hypothesis, because it claimed to have found a data collection bias, which led to an erroneous conclusion. This claimed bias came from incidents of cannibalism used in the analysis not being due to local cultures, but having been carried out by explorers, stranded seafarers or escaped convicts. The original authors published a subsequent paper in 2008 defending their conclusions.

== Myths, legends and folklore ==
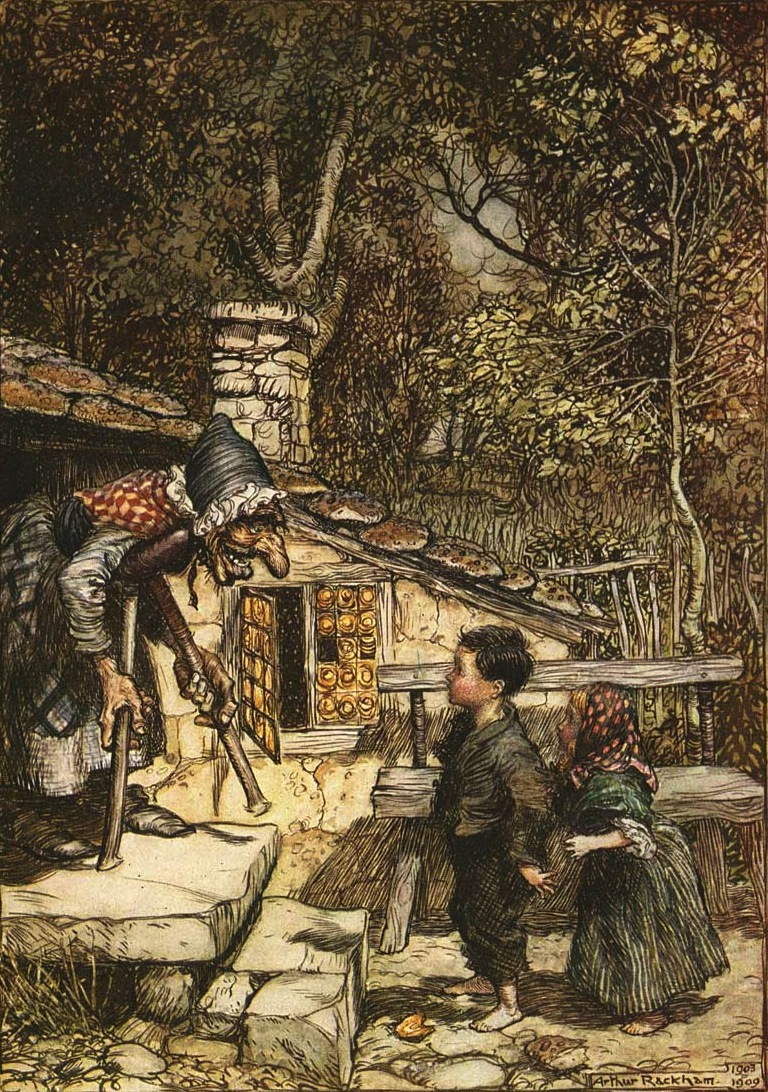
Hansel and Gretel, illustrated by Arthur Rackham

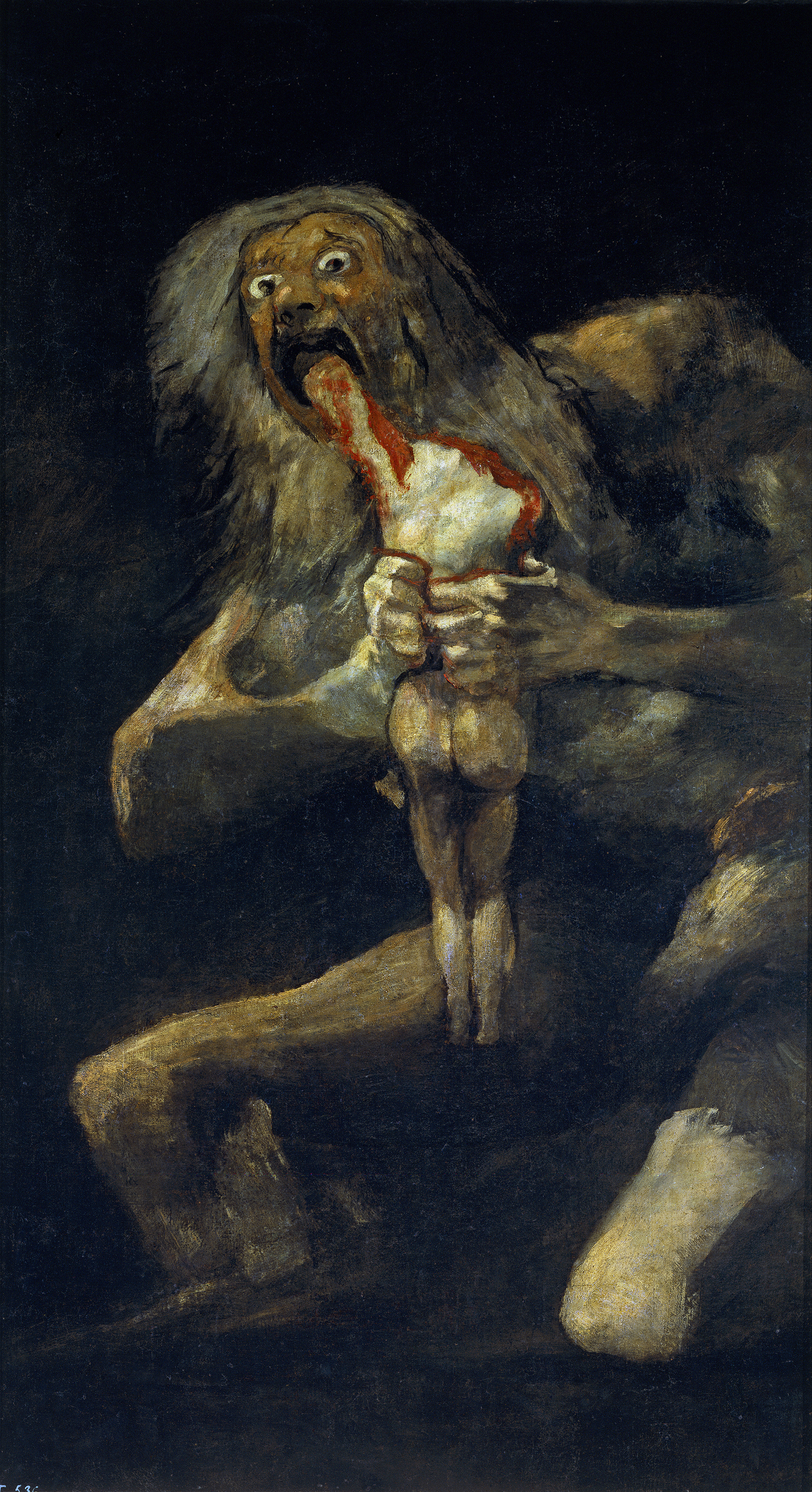
Saturn Devouring His Son, from the Black Paintings series by Francisco Goya, 1819

Cannibalism features in the folklore and legends of many cultures and is most often attributed to evil characters or as extreme retribution for some wrongdoing. Examples include the witch in "Hansel and Gretel", Lamia of Greek mythology, the witch Baba Yaga of Slavic folklore, and the Yama-uba in Japanese folklore.

A number of stories in Greek mythology involve cannibalism, in particular the eating of close family members, e.g., the stories of Thyestes, Tereus, and especially Cronus, who became Saturn in the Roman pantheon. The story of Tantalus is another example, though here a family member is prepared for consumption by others.

The wendigo is a creature appearing in the legends of the Algonquian people. It is thought of variously as a malevolent cannibalistic spirit that could possess humans or a monster that humans could physically transform into. Those who indulged in cannibalism were at particular risk, and the legend appears to have reinforced this practice as taboo. The Zuni people tell the story of the Átahsaia – a giant who cannibalizes his fellow demons and seeks out human flesh.

The wechuge is a demonic cannibalistic creature that seeks out human flesh appearing in the mythology of the Athabaskan people. It is said to be half monster and half human-like; however, it has many shapes and forms.

== In literature and popular culture ==
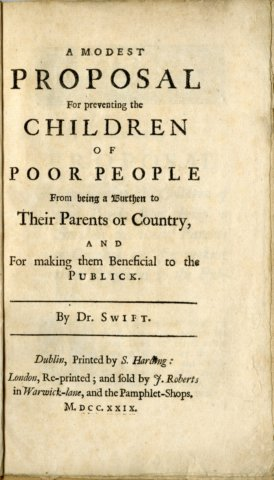
Cover of the first edition of Jonathan Swift's A Modest Proposal

Cannibalism is depicted in literary and other imaginative works across history. Homer's Odyssey, Beowulf, Shakespeare's Titus Andronicus, Daniel Defoe's Robinson Crusoe, Herman Melville's Moby-Dick, and Gustave Flaubert's Salammbo are prominent examples. It also features in several classic Chinese novels, such as Romance of the Three Kingdoms and Water Margin.

One of the most famous satirical essays in the English language concerns cannibalism. A Modest Proposal for Preventing the Children of Poor People from Being a Burthen to Their Parents or Country, and for Making Them Beneficial to the Publick, commonly referred to as A Modest Proposal, is a Juvenalian satire published by Anglo-Irish writer and clergyman Jonathan Swift in 1729. It suggests that poor people in Ireland could ease their economic troubles by selling their young children as food to the elite, and describes in detail the various advantages this would ostensibly have. Among other satirical works depicting cannibalism are Mark Twain's short story "Cannibalism in the Cars" (1868) and Mo Yan's novel The Republic of Wine (1992).

Cannibalism is also a recurring theme in popular culture, especially within the horror genre, with cannibal films being a notable subgenre. One of the best known fictional serial killers is a cannibal: Hannibal Lecter, created by Thomas Harris. Survival cannibalism is a topic of films such as Society of the Snow (2023) and TV series such as Yellowjackets (2021–). Other works mention cannibalism in post-apocalyptic settings, among them Cormac McCarthy's novel The Road (2006) and its 2009 film adaptation. People who consume human flesh without knowing it are depicted in various films, among them the science fiction classic Soylent Green (1973) and the horror comedy The Rocky Horror Picture Show (1975).

== Tropes and discourses ==
=== Prejudices ===
Cameroonian anthropologist Francis B. Nyamnjoh notes that accusations of cannibalism, whether justified or not, were often used to "other" non-Western peoples, thus serving to justify their colonization and exploitation. He notes that cannibalism was and is often regarded as "an evil act ... associated with primitive savages living dangerously like wild animals at the margins of humanity and human civilisation, and needing to be stamped out at all costs", with even those advocating cultural relativism usually becoming "uneas[y] when it comes to making a case for tolerance and accommodation of cannibalism".

According to Nyamnjoh, the "blanket disbelief in ritual [= not just exceptional] cannibalism" expressed by some authors (such as William Arens) indicates that they find it difficult to accept such a custom among the possible human behaviours, but do not want to appear narrow-minded by openly condemning it. He sees this stance as a superficial acknowledgement of cultural relativism that, however, avoids confronting the complex realities of diverse human experiences in other societies – the sometimes challenging "other ways of being human" that may include consuming the flesh of others. Nyamnjoh suggests that instead of making implausible arguments against the mere existence of cannibalism, it is more productive to accept it and view it in context. This perspective includes recognizing that there are other exploitative practices that, while not involving the physical consumption of others, are still deeply harmful to them.

Nyamnjoh warns that one must be careful when considering historical accounts attributing cannibalism to others, since "claims and accusations of cannibalism served as the perfect excuse for enslavement, colonisation, exploitation and forceful Christianisation and Westernisation". Whether factual, exaggerated, or imagined, such statements were used to justify "the colonising, enslaving and dispossessing ... of non-Western 'Others'". He warns, however, against throwing out the "baby" of credible evidence with the "bathwater" of exaggerated or merely rumoured "cannibal talk". He describes it as illogical that sceptics readily accept "state violence, bloody wars of genocidal proportions and violent encounters, slavery, colonialism and myriad forms of rabid imperialism" as part of the historical record, while rejecting the idea of cannibal practices that may well "have gone with or resulted from such conflicts". Nyamnjoh and others also note that Europeans were quite hypocritical when condemning the cannibalism of others, while at the same or almost the same time practising their own forms of cannibalism – especially medicinal cannibalism – at home.

=== Taboo ===
While cannibalism has sometimes been called "mankind's oldest taboo", several authors have identified this as a misleading trope contradicted by evidence showing that certain forms of cannibalism were, until fairly recent times, accepted in various parts of the world, including (for medical purposes and survival) in Europe. While there is no universal taboo against cannibalism, the idea that the practice is wrong is "deeply ingrained in the religions which have shaped the societies and the attitudes of the richer nations of the western hemisphere today." This allowed the taboo to spread so widely and thoroughly that many now regard it as self-evident and ancient.

Romanian philosopher Cǎtǎlin Avramescu suggests that the cannibalism taboo became so strong in the Christian world because of concerns about the resurrection of the flesh, the idea that the dead will ultimately be resurrected not just spiritually, but bodily as well. Everyone's body is made up of what they eat, and so, if people eat others, the eaten flesh would effectively have to exist twice to allow both the eaten and the eater to be resurrected at the same time. This paradox worried Christian thinkers such as Athenagoras of Athens and Thomas Aquinas. Though they concluded that the "infinite power" of God would nevertheless make it possible to bodily and fully resurrect both, it made cannibalism appear as a challenge to a central Christian doctrine, making it a "diabolical" act that had to be severely condemned.

=== Gender ===
American sociologist Katherine Martinez describes violent cannibalism as a form of "gendered consumption". She notes that, whether cannibalism was practised by ethnic groups or by individual murders such as Albert Fish or Issei Sagawa, the perpetrators and consumers were primarily men, while the victims were often women and children, or "feminized" men such as captured enemies who were deliberately consumed to humiliate and dominate them and their communities. The flesh of women and children was widely described as better than that of adult men, while women's breasts were sought as particular delicacies. In other cases, the victims belonged to particularly vulnerable groups such as the mostly homosexual, African American men and boys targeted by Jeffrey Dahmer. Martinez interprets many cannibal practices as forms of "patriarchal control", exerted by men over the "feminized bodies" of women, children, and "othered" men through their literal consumption – a particularly violent way of seeking "domination and control" over others, establishing a clear (and deadly) hierarchy between the eaters and the eaten.

== Scepticism ==
William Arens, author of The Man-Eating Myth: Anthropology and Anthropophagy, questions the credibility of reports of cannibalism and argues that the description by one group of people of another people as cannibals is a consistent and demonstrable ideological and rhetorical device to establish perceived cultural superiority. Arens bases his thesis on a detailed analysis of various "classic" cases of cannibalism reported by explorers, missionaries, and anthropologists. He claims that all of them were steeped in racism, unsubstantiated, or based on second-hand or hearsay evidence. Though widely discussed, Arens's book generally failed to convince the academic community. Claude Lévi-Strauss observes that, in spite of his "brilliant but superficial book ... [n]o serious ethnologist disputes the reality of cannibalism". Shirley Lindenbaum notes that, while after "Arens['s] ... provocative suggestion ... many anthropologists ... reevaluated their data", the outcome was an improved and "more nuanced" understanding of where, why and under which circumstances cannibalism took place rather than a confirmation of his claims: "Anthropologists working in the Americas, Africa, and Melanesia now acknowledge that institutionalized cannibalism occurred in some places at some times. Archaeologists and evolutionary biologists are taking cannibalism seriously."

Lindenbaum and others point out that Arens displays a "strong ethnocentrism". His refusal to admit that institutionalized cannibalism ever existed seems to be motivated by the implied idea "that cannibalism is the worst thing of all" – worse than any other behaviour people engaged in, and therefore uniquely suited to vilifying others. Kajsa Ekholm Friedman calls this "a remarkable opinion in a culture [the European/American one] that has been capable of the most extreme cruelty and destructive behavior, both at home and in other parts of the world."

She observes that, contrary to European values and expectations, "in many parts of the Congo region there was no negative evaluation of cannibalism. On the contrary, people expressed their strong appreciation of this very special meat and could not understand the hysterical reactions from the white man's side." And why indeed, she goes on to ask, should they have had the same negative reactions to cannibalism as Arens and his contemporaries? Implicitly he assumes that everybody throughout human history must have shared the strong taboo placed by his own culture on cannibalism, but he never attempts to explain why this should be so, and "neither logic nor historical evidence justifies" this viewpoint, as Christian Siefkes commented.

Some have argued that it is the taboo against cannibalism, rather than its practice, that needs to be explained. Hubert Murray, the Lieutenant-Governor of Papua in the early 20th century, admitted that "I have never been able to give a convincing answer to a native who says to me, 'Why should I not eat human flesh?'" After observing that the Orokaiva people in New Guinea explained their cannibal customs as due to "a simple desire for good food", the Australian anthropologist F. E. Williams commented: "Anthropologically speaking the fact that we ourselves should persist in a superstitious, or at least sentimental, prejudice against human flesh is more puzzling than the fact that the Orokaiva, a born hunter, should see fit to enjoy perfectly good meat when he gets it."

Accusations of cannibalism could be used to characterize indigenous peoples as "uncivilized", "primitive", or even "inhuman." While this means that the reliability of reports of cannibal practices must be carefully evaluated especially if their wording suggests such a context, many actual accounts do not fit this pattern. The earliest firsthand account of cannibal customs in the Caribbean comes from Diego Álvarez Chanca, who accompanied Christopher Columbus on his second voyage. His description of the customs of the Caribs of Guadeloupe includes their cannibalism (men killed or captured in war were eaten, while captured boys were "castrated [and used as] servants until they gr[e]w up, when they [were] slaughtered" for consumption), but he nevertheless notes "that these people are more civilized than the other islanders" (who did not practice cannibalism). Nor was he an exception. Among the earliest reports of cannibalism in the Caribbean and the Americas, there are some (like those of Amerigo Vespucci) that seem to mostly consist of hearsay and "gross exaggerations", but others (by Chanca, Columbus himself, and other early travellers) show "genuine interest and respect for the natives" and include "numerous cases of sincere praise".

Reports of cannibalism from other continents follow similar patterns. Condescending remarks can be found, but many Europeans who described cannibal customs in Central Africa wrote about those who practised them in quite positive terms, calling them "splendid" and "the finest people" and not rarely, like Chanca, actually considering them as "far in advance of" and "intellectually and morally superior" to the non-cannibals around them. Writing from Melanesia, the missionary George Brown explicitly rejects the European prejudice of picturing cannibals as "particularly ferocious and repulsive", noting instead that many cannibals he met were "no more ferocious than" others and "indeed ... very nice people".

Reports or assertions of cannibal practices could nevertheless be used to promote the use of military force as a means of "civilizing" and "pacifying" the "savages". During the Spanish conquest of the Aztec Empire and its earlier conquests in the Caribbean there were widespread reports of cannibalism, and cannibals became exempted from Queen Isabella's prohibition on enslaving the indigenous. Another example of the sensationalism of cannibalism and its connection to imperialism occurred during Japan's 1874 expedition to Taiwan. As Robert Eskildsen describes, Japan's popular media "exaggerated the aborigines' violent nature", in some cases by wrongly accusing them of cannibalism.

This Horrid Practice: The Myth and Reality of Traditional Maori Cannibalism (2008) by New Zealand historian Paul Moon received a hostile reception by some Māori, who felt the book tarnished their whole people. However, the factual accuracy of the book was not seriously disputed and even critics such as Margaret Mutu grant that cannibalism was "definitely" practised and that it was "part of our [Māori] culture."

== Ethics ==
=== Modern views ===
While in modern society, cannibalism is widely considered ethically and morally wrong, Mathew Lu notes that "it is surprisingly difficult to explain why". Distinguishing "active" (killing someone to eat them) from "passive cannibalism" (eating the flesh of somebody whose death one has not caused), Lu notes that it is chiefly passive cannibalism that poses a problem, since killing somebody is in most cases considered wrong anyway. In such cases, the wrongness comes from the killing, regardless of whether or not it is followed by cannibalism. But the question of eating the body of someone who has died of unrelated reasons is harder to evaluate. Lu agrees with several other authors that on a utilitarian or Kantian basis it seems impossible to establish that such acts are wrong, since no living person is wronged in the process. In utilitarianism, if a cannibal act increases the happiness of some people – say the eaters enjoy their meal – without decreasing the happiness of others (maybe the eaten had no friends or relatives or they do not know about the cannibalism), it can even be considered as beneficial, leading to a net gain in happiness.

While Kantian philosophy demands that other human beings should always be treated "as ends, never merely as means", corpses are no longer autonomous persons and there is no straightforward basis on which to establish that they cannot be used as means, for example for eating. J. Jeremy Wisnewski, who evaluates these and other arguments in a similar manner, concludes that there is no "rational justification for the cannibalism prohibition", since all "arguments for the immorality of cannibalism" he was able to find and examine "have been found wanting". For him, a general decision against eating human flesh can therefore only be based on "sentimental", not on "moral" reasons.

While Lu agrees that utilitarian and Kantian philosophy cannot explain why (non-deadly) cannibalism is wrong, he suggests instead turning to a virtue ethics in the Aristotelian tradition. On this basis, he argues, it is possible to assign "genuine moral value" to human corpses that therefore deserve to be treated with respect – a respect that would be violated by using them as food, except in life-or-death situations. He considers the preservation of human life the sole acceptable justification for cannibalism, meaning that corpses may be eaten as a last resort to face off starvation if other provisions are unavailable. Other than that, while some usages of a corpse may still be respectful, eating it is not, since it reduces the body to mere food, a general form it shares with other edible substances. In the process of cooking and eating a body, the previous human form of the eaten is disregarded and completely destroyed. Lu argues that whenever alternative, non-human foods are available, it is unnecessary, disrespectful, and therefore wrong to destroy the "residual humanity" still present in a corpse in such a way.

From a consequentialist perspective, John Shand considers it impossible to give a "rational moral justification" against non-deadly cannibalism, because a person who is already dead cannot be harmed further by being consumed. He concludes that the "strong moral abhorrence" of cannibalism, widely felt in modern society, is groundless and "impervious to argument". Considering this and some other widely held, but rarely rationally justified convictions, he concludes that "we are not as rational as we like to think we are". He moreover notes that the evaluation of cases following a violent death depends on how one morally evaluates the death. Murdering someone is wrong by definition, hence murdering someone to eat them is wrong too. But killing enemy fighters in warfare is often considered justified at least in certain cases, and Shand argues that in such cases there can be no rational reason to consider the subsequent cannibalization of fallen enemies – once a widespread practice in societies that engaged in exocannibalism – as wrong.

In a 1982 paper that "attracted most notoriety", New Zealand–born philosopher Richard Routley likewise argues that certain forms of cannibalism are morally admissible. Taking a non-speciesist viewpoint, he rejects the assumption "that Homo sapiens as a species deserves special treatment", instead arguing that "there is no morally relevant distinction between humans and all other creatures". For him, a "non-chauvinist ethics" only leaves the choice between "vegetarian options", which exclude the eating of any meat, and "cannibal(istic) options", which allow the consumption of both animal and human meat under specific circumstances. As long as people are not deliberately killed, he regards the "respectful" consumption of their dead bodies as admissible, especially if they had consented to this treatment in advance (like many people agree to donate their organs after death), but also if they had not. Regarding the latter case, he argues that buried bodies are eaten by bacteria, other microorganisms, and small animals (detritivores), so a process of consumption happens in either case without requiring consent. While cremation is another alternative, he rejects it as wasteful compared to "carefully compost[ing]" a body through consumption.

Routley furthermore writes that in cases where killing someone is justified (in warfare, self-defence, or possibly as punishment), the subsequent cannibalization of the dead body is admissible, since it was not the reason for the killing. For him, the fact that most people consider it unacceptable "to raise other humans for food", while accepting that animals are bred and raised for this purpose, poses "a serious and difficult question". He argues that there are no sufficiently "significant and relevant differences between humans and other creatures" to justify such a difference in treatment. For him, any "nonchauvinistic" solution to when raising or killing an individual for food is considered acceptable must not take the individual's species into account – he considers it unjustifiable to treat humans differently from (other) animals merely because they are human.

According to some versions of moral relativism, it is impossible to summarily reject or accept cannibalism, because any practice can only be judged within the context of the culture where it takes place. Hence if the members of a culture accept and practise the consumption of human flesh in certain circumstances or even the killing of (certain) persons to eat them, outsiders from other cultures cannot tell them that they are wrong.

=== Cultivated human meat ===
Modern technology has made it possible to cultivate meat in the laboratory instead of butchering a creature to provide it. This had triggered discussions about whether eating such meat from species that are normally considered "off-limits" (including humans) is ethically acceptable since no suffering and death is involved. Philosophers Thomas Montefiore and John Goris argue that, though the usual distinction between "fair-game" meats (e.g. chicken and fish) and "off-limits" meats (e.g. from humans or from threatened species such as rhinos and tigers) remains intuitively relevant when eating cultivated meat, there is no rational justification for upholding it. Logically, one either has to reject the consumption of any cultivated meat or to accept that it might come from arbitrary species, including humans.

G. Owen Schaefer and Julian Savulescu discuss "the possible spectre of cannibalism" as a potential objection against cultivated meat in general. They note that most cases of cannibalism are "morally objectionable" because they involve "the desecration of a corpse" and often also the deliberate "killing of a human being", with neither factor applying to cultivated human meat. Eating such meat could be considered disrespectful towards the "donor" whose genetic or tissue samples are used, but they argue that this is only a problem if it happens without the donor's consent. Hence they see no ethical reason for banning the cultivation of human meat for eating purposes as long as proper consent was received. Considering that most people feel "revulsion at the prospect of cannibalism", they doubt that such consumption could become widespread, while granting that it might find a niche audience.

Marco Locarno, on the other hand, argues that the consumption of cultivated human meat should be forbidden. He writes that, from a deontological standpoint, treating human tissue as food would be degrading for both the donor and humanity as a whole, since "eating implies superiority over the object eaten" and eating this tissue would deny its specific humanness, treating it as not essentially different from other food. He admits that, when taking a consequentialist/utilitarian standpoint instead, eating cultivated human meat seems acceptable as long as the donor had consented to this, but continues that even from this standpoint it should be forbidden because of possible negative consequences. Among these he sees the risk that if people discover they like the taste, some might develop a curiosity or even a craving for "natural" human meat, possibly causing some to engage in harmful acts such as stealing corpses or even killing others to eat them. Another risk he sees is the possible emergence of a "black market" in cultivated human meat from nonconsenting donors.

In a 2024 British survey, 88% of the respondents said that the commercial production of cultivated human meat should be forbidden – a higher ratio than for any animal species included in the survey. On the other hand, when questioned whether they would try such meat "it were legally allowed and commercially available", 20% of the respondents said they would, for reasons such as curiosity. This constituted a considerable fraction of the 26% willing to try cultivated animal meat. Men and young people (below 25) were more inclined to try human meat than women and older persons.

== History ==
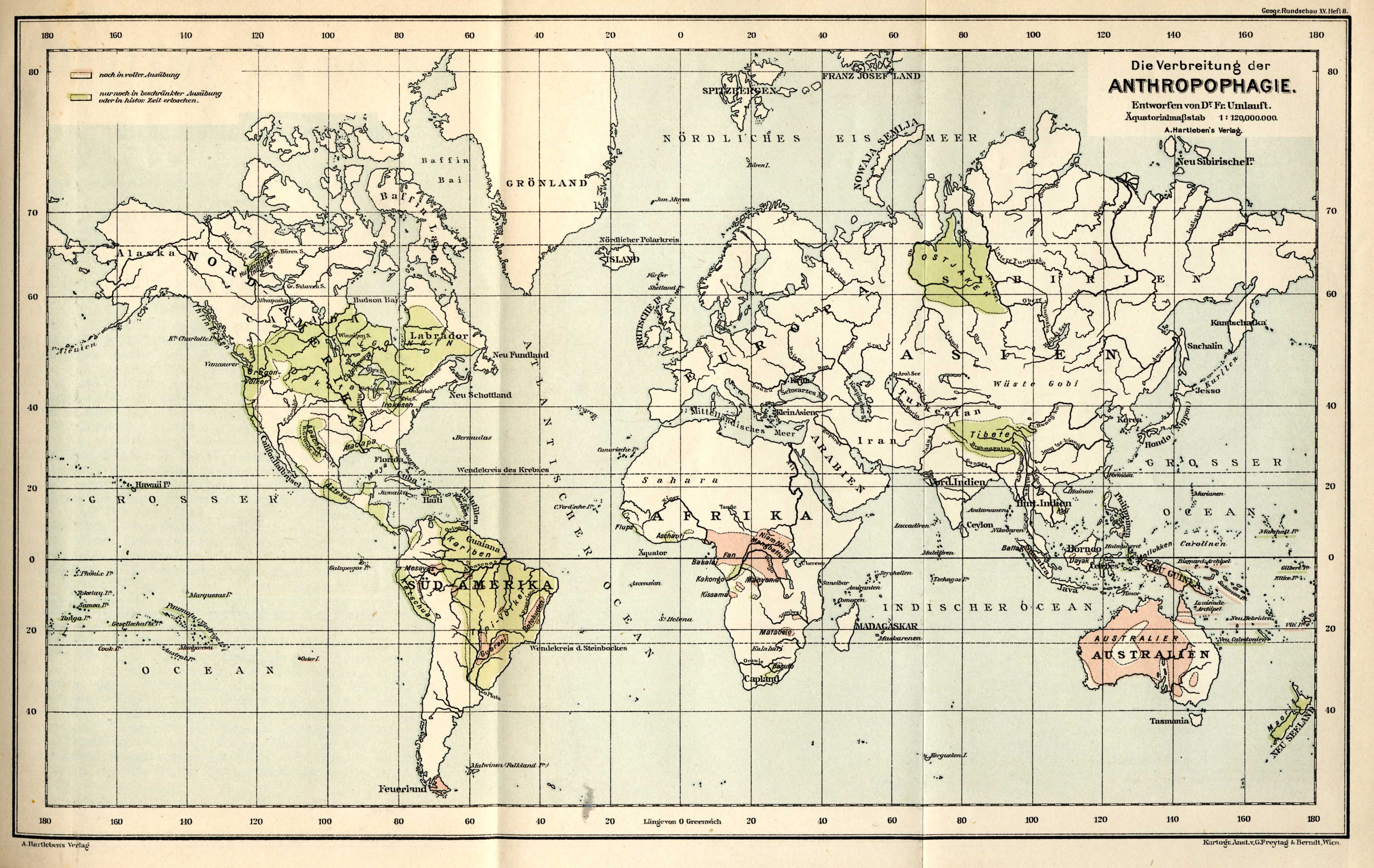
A German map published in 1893 depicting the distribution of human cannibalism as seen by the publishers. Pink areas thought to still be "fully" cannibalistic at that time; light green areas considered formerly or rarely cannibalistic.

There is archaeological evidence that cannibalism has been practised for at least hundreds of thousands of years by early Homo sapiens and archaic hominins, including Homo erectus. Among modern humans, cannibalism has been practised by various groups. An incomplete list of cases where it is documented to have occurred in institutionalized form includes prehistoric and early modern Europe, South America, Mesoamerica, Iroquoian peoples in North America, parts of Western and Central Africa, China and Sumatra, among pre-contact Aboriginal Australians, among Māori in New Zealand, on some other Polynesian islands as well as in New Guinea, the Solomon Islands, and Fiji. Evidence of cannibalism has also been found in ruins associated with the Ancestral Puebloans, at Cowboy Wash in the Southwestern United States.

After World War I, institutionalized cannibalism has become very rare, but cases were still reported during times of famine. Occasional cannibal acts committed by individual criminals also are documented throughout the 20th and 21st centuries.

=== The Americas ===
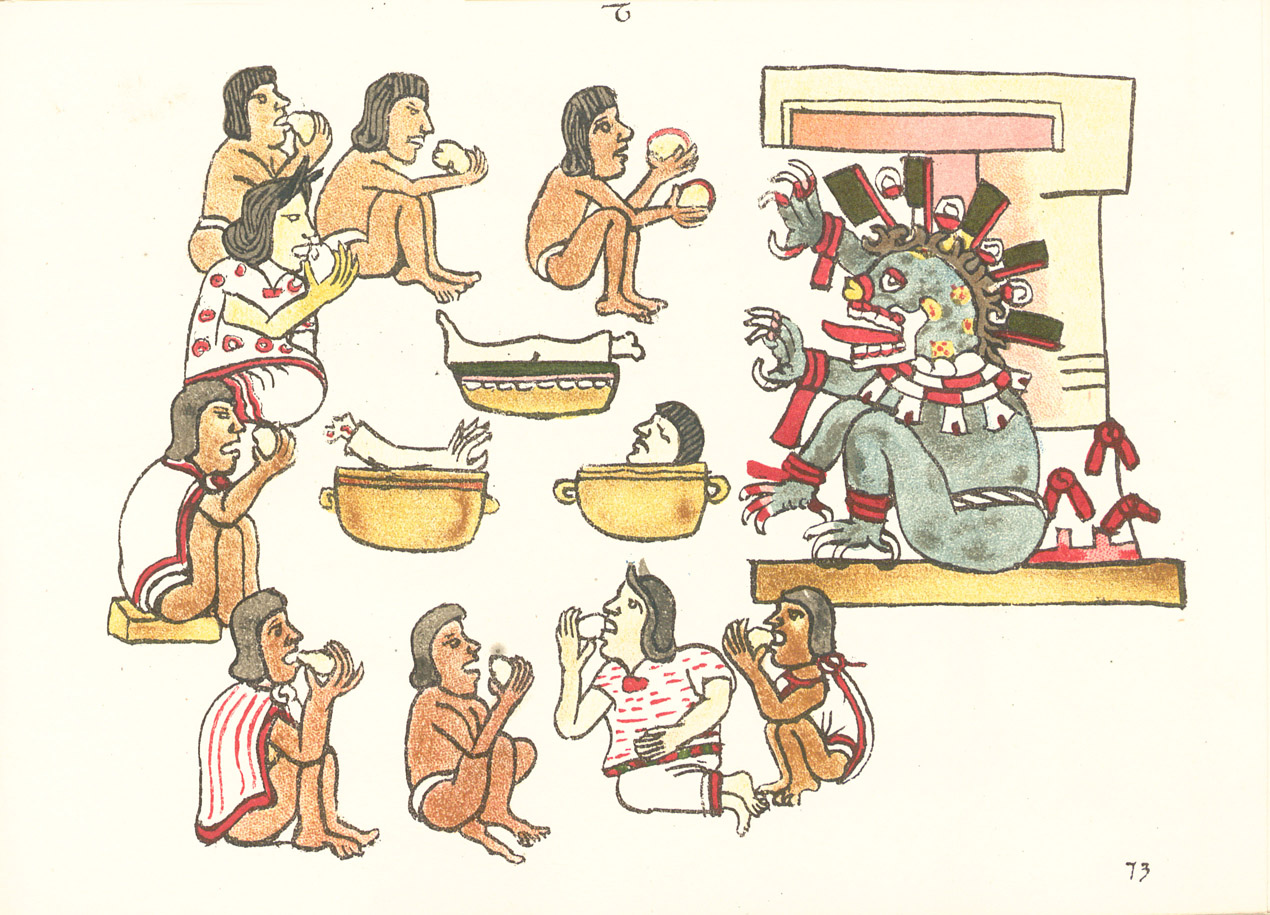
A scene depicting ritualistic Aztec cannibalism being practiced in the Codex Magliabechiano, folio 73r.

The history and scope of cannibalism in the Americas is complex, involving ritual or cultural practices connected with human sacrifice and warfare as well as instances motivated by famine and criminal cases. The modern term "cannibal" is derived from the name of the Island Caribs (Kalinago), who were encountered by Christopher Columbus in The Bahamas. While numerous cultures in the Americas were reported by European explorers and colonizers to have engaged in cannibalism, some of these claims may be unreliable since the Spanish Empire used them to justify conquest.

At least some cultures have been archeologically proven beyond any doubt to have undertaken institutionalized cannibalism. This includes human bones uncovered in a cave hamlet confirming accounts of the Xiximes undertaking ritualized raids as part of their agricultural cycle after every harvest. Also proven are the Aztec ritual ceremonies during the Spanish conquest at Tecoaque. The Anasazi in the 12th century have also been demonstrated to have undertaken cannibalism, possibly due to drought, as shown by proteins from human flesh found in recovered feces.

There is near universal agreement that some Mesoamericans practiced human sacrifice and cannibalism, but there is no scholarly consensus as to its extent. Anthropologist Marvin Harris, author of Cannibals and Kings, has suggested that the flesh of the victims was a part of an aristocratic diet as a reward since the Aztec diet was lacking in proteins. According to Harris, the Aztec economy would not support feeding enslaved people (the captured in war), and the columns of prisoners were "marching meat." Conversely, Bernard R. Ortiz de Montellano has proposed that Aztec cannibalism coincided with harvest times and should be considered more of a Thanksgiving. Montellano rejects the theories of Harner and Harris, saying that with evidence of so many tributes and intensive chinampa agriculture, the Aztecs did not need any other food sources. William Arens' 1979 book The Man-Eating Myth claimed that "there is no firm, substantiable evidence for the socially accepted practice of cannibalism anywhere in the world, at any time in history", but his views have been largely rejected as irreconcilable with the actual evidence.

In later times, cannibalism has occasionally been practiced as a last resort by people suffering from famine. Well-known examples include the ill-fated Donner Party (1846–1847) and the crash of Uruguayan Air Force Flight 571 (1972), after which the survivors ate the bodies of the dead. Additionally, there are cases of people engaging in cannibalism for sexual pleasure, such as Albert Fish and Jeffrey Dahmer. In the Amazon, some groups continue to practice forms of funerary cannibalism.

=== Africa ===
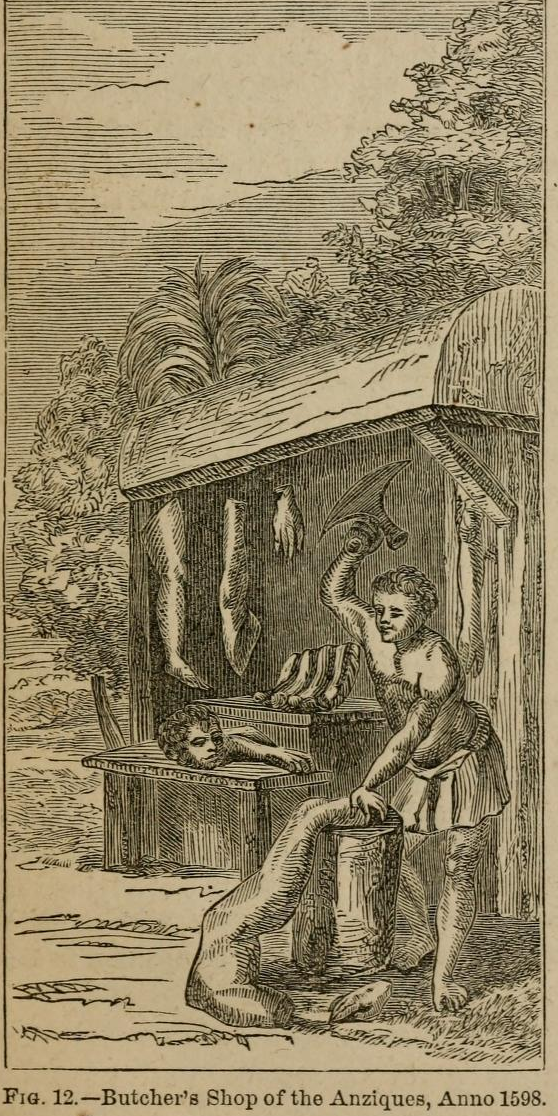
Sale of human flesh in the late 16th century. Engraving by Theodor de Bry illustrating Filippo Pigafetta's Report of the Kingdom of Congo, which contains the oldest known account of cannibalism in Central Africa.

Acts of cannibalism in Africa have been reported from various parts of the continent, ranging from prehistory until the 21st century. The oldest firm evidence of archaic humans consuming each other dates to 1.45 million years ago in Kenya. Archaeological evidence for human cannibalism exists later among anatomically modern humans, but its frequency remains unknown. Later in East Africa, the Ugandan dictator Idi Amin was reputed to practise cannibalism, and acts of voluntary and forced cannibalism have been reported from the South Sudanese Civil War. While the oldest known written mention of cannibalism is from the tomb of the Egyptian king Unas, later evidence from Egypt shows it to only re-appear during occasional episodes of severe famine.

Reports describing cannibal practices were most often recorded by outsiders and were especially during the colonial epoch commonly used to justify the subjugation and exploitation of non-European peoples in Africa and elsewhere, therefore such sources need to be particularly critically examined before being accepted. There is nevertheless good evidence of cannibal customs once existing in certain contexts in some African regions as well as in other parts of the world (including Europe). The idea of a universal taboo against cannibalism, implicitly or explicitly used by some authors to reject any such evidence, has been criticized as ethnocentric by others since it takes a notion from the modern Western world and declares it to be universal.

The oldest records of cannibalism in West Africa are from Muslim authors who visited the region in the 14th century. Later accounts often ascribe it to secret societies such as the Leopard Society. Cannibal practices were also reported among various Nigerian peoples. The victims were usually killed or captured enemies, kidnapped strangers, and purchased slaves. Cannibalism was practised to express hatred and to humiliate one's enemies, as well as to avoid waste and because meat in general was rare; human flesh was also considered tastier than that of animals. While its consumption during peacetime seems to have ceased, cannibal acts are on record for civil wars in Liberia and Sierra Leone around the turn from the 20th to the 21st century.

In the late 19th century, cannibalism seems to have been especially prevalent in parts of the Congo Basin. While some groups rejected the custom, others indulged in human flesh, often considering it superior to other meats. Killed or captured enemies could be consumed, and individuals from different ethnic groups were sometimes hunted down for the same purpose. Enslaved people were also sacrificed for the table, especially young children, who were otherwise in little demand but praised as particularly delicious. In some areas, human flesh and slaves intended for eating were sold at marketplaces. While cannibalism became rarer under the colonial Congo Free State and its Belgium-run successor, colonial authorities seem to have done little to suppress the practice. Human flesh still appeared on the tables up to the 1950s and was eaten and sold during the Congo Crisis in the 1960s. Occasional reports of cannibalism during violent conflicts continue into the 21st century.

Cannibalism was also reported from north of the Congo Basin, extending up to the Central African Republic Civil War, which started in 2012. Jean-Bédel Bokassa, dictator of the Central African Republic, seems to have eaten the flesh of opponents and prisoners in the 1970s. In the 19th century, cannibalism was also practised in the Southern African Zulu Kingdom and adjacent areas during times of famine and social disruption, particularly during a violent period that became known as Mfecane.

=== Europe ===
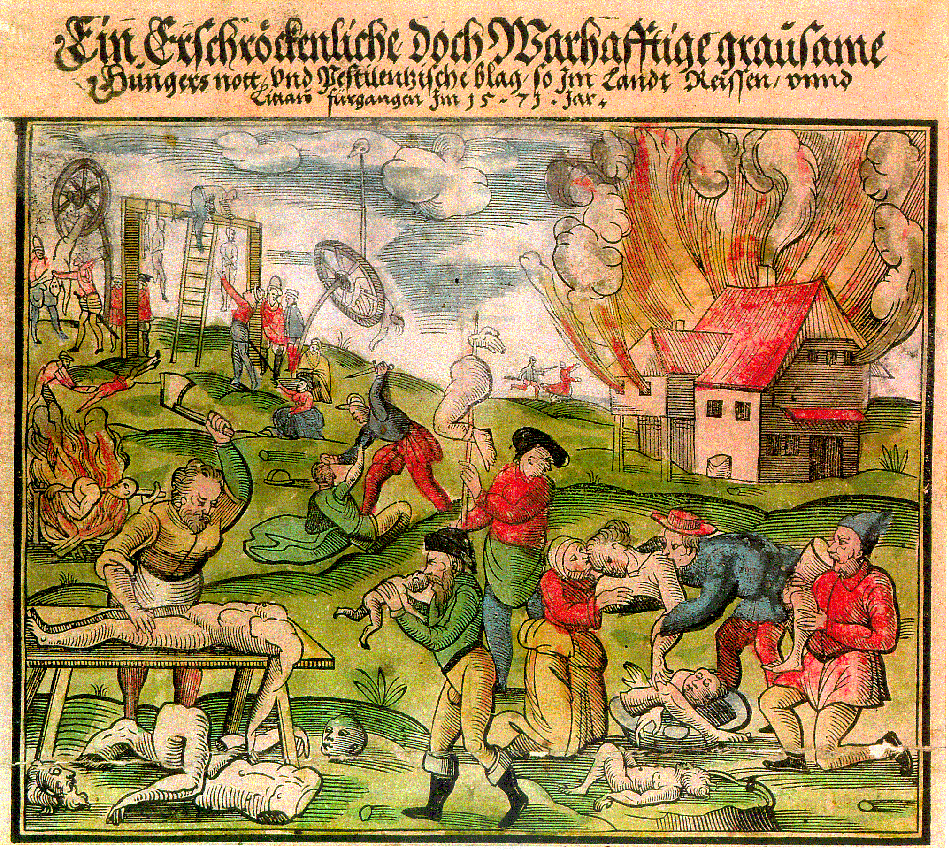
Cannibalism in Lithuania during the Livonian War in 1571 (German plate)

Acts of cannibalism in Europe seem to have been relatively prevalent in prehistory but also occurred repeatedly in later times, often motivated by hunger, hatred, or medical concerns. Both anatomically modern humans and Neanderthals practised cannibalism to some extent in the Pleistocene, and Neanderthals may have been eaten by modern humans as the latter spread into Europe. Amongst humans in prehistoric Europe, archaeologists have uncovered many clear and indisputable sites of cannibalism, as well as numerous other finds of which cannibalism is a plausible interpretation.

In antiquity, several Greek and Roman authors mentioned cannibal customs in remote parts of the continent, such as beyond the Dnieper River and in Britain. The Stoic philosopher Chrysippus noted that burial customs varied widely, with funerary cannibalism being practised by many peoples, though rejected by the Greeks. Several cases of survival cannibalism during sieges are on record. Cannibalism to stave off starvation was also practised in later times, such as during the Great Famine of 1315–1317. In the early modern and colonial era, shipwrecked sailors ate the bodies of the deceased or drew lots to decide who would have to die to provide food for the others in cases of cannibalism at sea.

During the First Crusade, some crusaders ate the bodies of killed enemies, with the reasons for these acts (hunger or intimidation) being a matter of debate. Various cases of undoubtedly revenge-driven cannibalism took place in early modern Italy. In 1672, the Dutch statesman Johan de Witt and his brother were lynched and partially eaten by an angry mob. In early modern Europe, the consumption of body parts and blood for medical purposes became popular. Reaching its height during the 17th century, this practice continued in some cases into the second half of the 19th century.

The first half of the 20th century saw a resurgence of acts of survival cannibalism in Eastern Europe, especially during the Russian famine of 1921–1922, the Soviet famine of 1930–1933, and the siege of Leningrad. Several serial killers, among them Karl Denke and Andrei Chikatilo, consumed parts of their victims. A few other people, such as reporter William Seabrook and artist Rick Gibson, ate human flesh out of curiosity or to shock the public, without killing anyone for the purpose. At the start of the 21st century, Armin Meiwes became infamous for killing and eating a voluntary victim, whom he had found via the Internet.

=== Asia ===
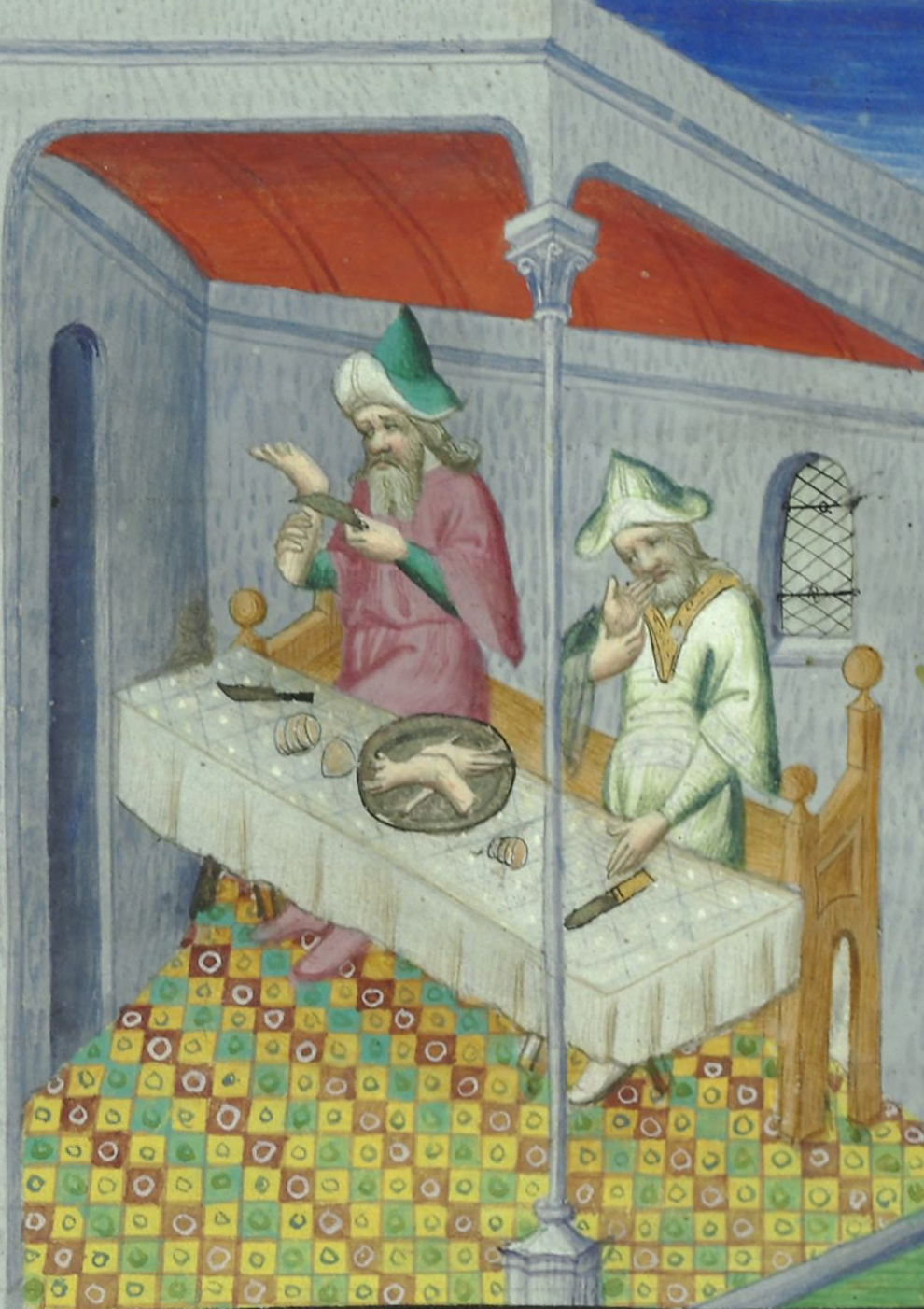
Fanciful depiction of cannibalism in China, from a 15th-century edition of The Travels of Marco Polo

Acts of cannibalism in Asia have been reported from various parts of the continent, ranging from ancient history to the 21st century. Human cannibalism is particularly well documented for China and for islands that today belong to Indonesia.

The history of cannibalism in China is multifaceted, spanning from cases motivated by food scarcity during famines and wars to culturally accepted practices motivated by vengeance, medical beliefs, and even culinary pleasure. Records from China's Twenty-Four Histories document over three hundred episodes of cannibalism, many of them seen as an inevitable means of avoiding starvation. Cannibalism was also employed as a form of vengeance, with individuals and state officials consuming enemies' flesh to further humiliate and punish them. The Histories also document multiple instances of voluntary cannibalism, often involving young individuals offering some of their flesh to ill family members as a form of medical treatment. Various reports, especially from early history and the medieval era, indicate that human flesh could also be served at lavish feasts and was considered an exotic delicacy by some. Generally, the reports from Chinese history suggest that people had fewer reservations about eating human flesh than one might expect today.

Episodes of cannibalism in China continued into the 20th century, especially during the Great Leap Forward (1958–1962) famine. During the Cultural Revolution (1966–1976), multiple cases motivated by hatred rather than hunger seem to have occurred.

In Sumatra, cannibal practices are documented especially for the 14th and the 19th centuries, with purchased children, killed or captured enemies, and executed criminals mentioned as typical victims. In neighbouring Borneo, some Dayak people ate human flesh, especially in the context of headhunting expeditions and war campaigns. In both islands and also in China, human flesh was praised as extraordinarily delicious. Accounts from the 20th and early 21st centuries indicate that the cannibalization of despised enemies could still occur during episodes of mass violence, such as the Indonesian mass killings of 1965–66 and, more recently, the Sampit conflict.

Cases of famine cannibalism have been reported from North Korea during the mid-1990s and subsequent starvation periods, but their prevalence is debated. Various reports indicate that some Japanese soldiers ate human flesh during World War II, motivated by starvation or sometimes by hatred.

=== Oceania ===
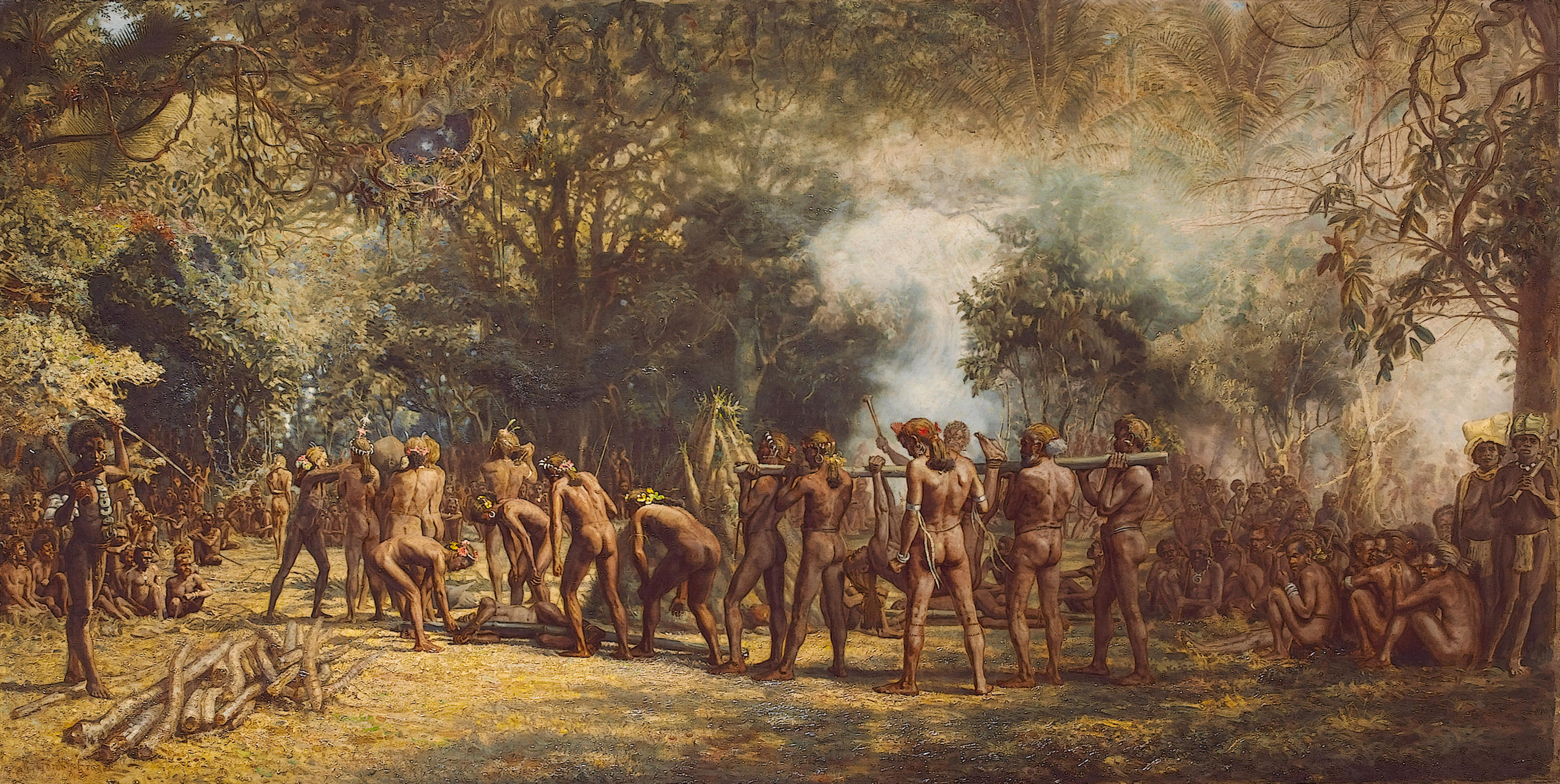
A cannibal feast on Tanna, Vanuatu, c. 1885–1889

Cannibalism in Oceania is well documented for many parts of this region, with reports ranging from the early modern period to, in a few cases, the 21st century. Some archaeological evidence has also been found. Human cannibalism in Melanesia and Polynesia was primarily associated with war, with victors eating the vanquished, while in Australia it was confined to a minority of Aboriginal groups and was mostly associated with mortuary rites or as a contingency for hardship to avoid starvation.

Cannibalism used to be widespread in parts of Fiji (once nicknamed the "Cannibal Isles"), among the Māori people of New Zealand, and in the Marquesas Islands. It was also practised in New Guinea and in parts of the Solomon Islands. According to some reports, cannibalism was still practised in Papua New Guinea around 2012, for cultural reasons.

== See also ==
- Autocannibalism, the practice of eating oneself (also called self-cannibalism)
- Cannibal film
- Cannibalism at sea
- Cannibalism in Africa
- Cannibalism in Asia
- Cannibalism in Europe
- Cannibalism in literature
- Cannibalism in Oceania
- Cannibalism in popular culture
- Cannibalism in poultry
- Cannibalism in the Americas
- Cannibalization (marketing), a business strategy
- Child cannibalism for children as victims of cannibalism (in myth and reality)
- Endocannibalism, the consumption of persons from the same community, often as a funerary rite
- Exocannibalism, the consumption of persons from outside the community, often enemies killed or captured in war
- Filial cannibalism, the consumption of one's own offspring
- Homo antecessor, an extinct human species providing some of the earliest known evidence for human cannibalism
- Human placentophagy, the consumption of the placenta (afterbirth)
- Issei Sagawa, a Japanese man who became a minor celebrity after killing and eating another student
- List of incidents of cannibalism
- Medical cannibalism, the consumption of human body parts to treat or prevent diseases
- Placentophagy, the act of mammals eating the placenta of their young after childbirth
- Pleistocene human diet, the eating habits of human ancestors in the Pleistocene
- Sexual cannibalism, behaviour of (usually female) animals that eat their mates during or after copulation
- Transmissible spongiform encephalopathy, an incurable disease that can damage the brain and nervous system of many animals, including humans
- Vorarephilia, a sexual fetish and paraphilia where arousal results from the idea of devouring others or being devoured

== Bibliography ==
- Arens, William (1979). The Man-Eating Myth: Anthropology and Anthropophagy. Oxford University Press. ISBN 978-0-19-976344-3.
- Boulestin, Bruno; Coupey, Anne-Sophie (2015). Cannibalism in the Linear Pottery Culture: The Human Remains from Herxheim. Oxford: Archaeopress.
- Chong, Key Ray (1990). Cannibalism in China. Wakefield, NH: Longwood.
- Cole, James (April 6, 2017). "Assessing the Calorific Significance of Episodes of Human Cannibalism in the Palaeolithic". Scientific Reports. 7 44707. Bibcode:2017NatSR...744707C. doi:10.1038/srep44707. ISSN 2045-2322. PMC 5382840. PMID 28383521.
- Constantine, Nathan (2006). A History of Cannibalism: From Ancient Cultures to Survival Stories and Modern Psychopaths. Edison, New Jersey: Chartwell Books. ISBN 978-0-7858-2158-8.
- Edgerton, Robert B. (2002). The Troubled Heart of Africa: A History of the Congo. New York: St. Martin's Press.
- Harris, Marvin (1991) [1977]. Cannibals and Kings: Origins of Cultures. New York: Vintage Books. ISBN 0-679-72849-X. OCLC 23985455.
- Hogg, Garry (1958). Cannibalism and Human Sacrifice. London: Robert Hale.
- Lu, Mathew (2013). "Explaining the Wrongness of Cannibalism". American Catholic Philosophical Quarterly. 87 (3): 433–458. doi:10.5840/acpq201387332. Archived from the original on August 18, 2025.
- Moon, Paul (2008). This Horrid Practice: The Myth and Reality of Traditional Maori Cannibalism. North Shore, New Zealand: Penguin.
- Nyamnjoh, Francis B. (2018). "Introduction: Cannibalism as Food for Thought". Eating and Being Eaten: Cannibalism as Food for Thought. Bamenda: Langaa. pp. 1–98. doi:10.2307/j.ctvh9vtgp.
- Ortiz de Montellano, Bernard R. (1978). "Aztec Cannibalism: An Ecological Necessity?". Science. 200 (4342): 611–617. Bibcode:1978Sci...200..611O. doi:10.1126/science.200.4342.611. PMID 17812682. S2CID 35652641. Archived from the original on August 5, 2009.
- Rubinstein, William D. (2014). Genocide: A History. New York: Routledge. ISBN 978-0-582-50601-5.
- Shankman, Paul (1969). "Le Rôti et le Bouilli: Lévi-Strauss' Theory of Cannibalism". American Anthropologist. 71 (1): 54–69. doi:10.1525/aa.1969.71.1.02a00060. ISSN 0002-7294. JSTOR 671228.
- Siefkes, Christian (2022). Edible People: The Historical Consumption of Slaves and Foreigners and the Cannibalistic Trade in Human Flesh. New York: Berghahn. ISBN 978-1-80073-613-9. Archived from the original on July 12, 2023.
- Tannahill, Reay (1975). Flesh and Blood: A History of the Cannibal Complex. New York: Stein and Day. ISBN 978-0-8128-1756-0.
- Travis-Henikoff, Carole A. (2008). Dinner with a Cannibal: The Complete History of Mankind's Oldest Taboo. Santa Monica: Santa Monica Press.
- Zheng, Yi (2018). Scarlet Memorial: Tales of Cannibalism in Modern China. Taylor & Francis. ISBN 978-0-429-97277-5.
