= Exocannibalism =

Eating the flesh of humans that do not belong to one's community

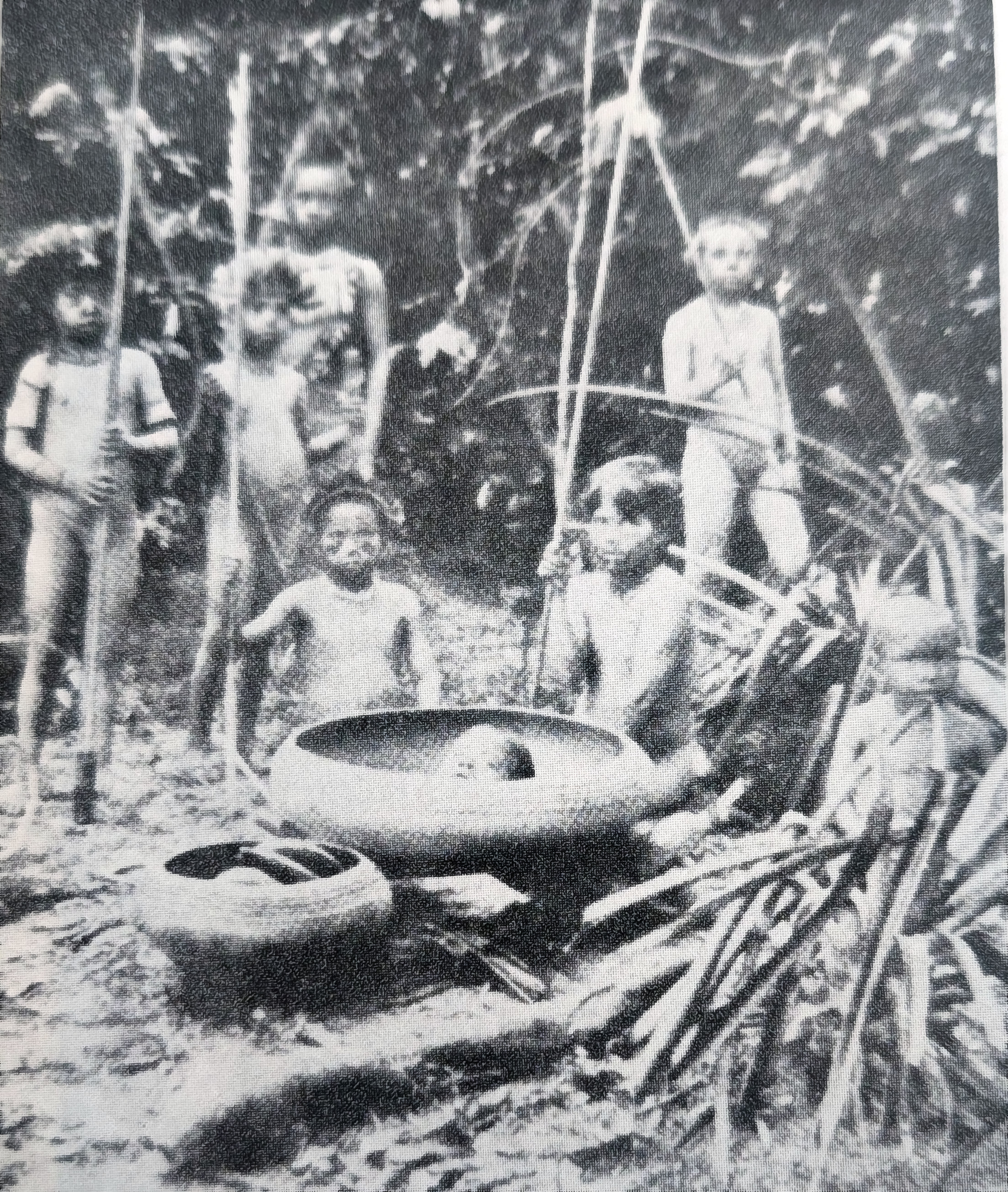
Young aborigines from the Putumayo area in the Amazon basin roasting and eating an enemy

Exocannibalism (from Greek exo-, "from outside" and cannibalism, "to eat humans"), as opposed to endocannibalism, is the consumption of flesh from humans that do not belong to one's close social group—for example, eating one's enemies. It has been interpreted as an attempt to acquire desired qualities of the victim and as an "ultimate form of humiliation and domination" of a vanquished enemy in warfare. Such practices have been documented in various cultures, including the Aztecs in Mexico and the Caribs and Tupinambá in South America.

Historically, it has also been used as a practical expediency in especially desperate attritional or guerrilla warfare when the extreme hunger and the abundance of humans being killed coincide to create conditions ripe for cannibalism. Some have interpreted the practice as a form of predation rather than a ritual act, seeing perpetrator and victim in the roles of predator versus prey.

== Cultural practice ==
Exocannibalism in the form of eating enemies is often done to express hostility and domination toward the victim. The perpetrator eats their victim to inflict ultimate indignity and humiliation. It has also been practised along with headhunting and scalping to display war trophies. John Kantner, an archaeologist who studied cannibalism in the American Southwest, concluded that when resources decrease, the competition of societies increases and exocannibalism can ensue.

While exocannibalism is generally contrasted with endocannibalism, both are forms of institutionalized or ritual cannibalism (widely accepted in the societies where they occur), as opposed to cases practised during starvation situations or by isolated, often pathological individuals.

Cultures practising both forms of ritual cannibalism seem to be rare, but one well-studied case are the Wariʼ, an Amazonian people in Brazil that used to eat both killed enemies and deceased relatives, though in markedly distinct ways.

== Cultures known for exocannibalism ==
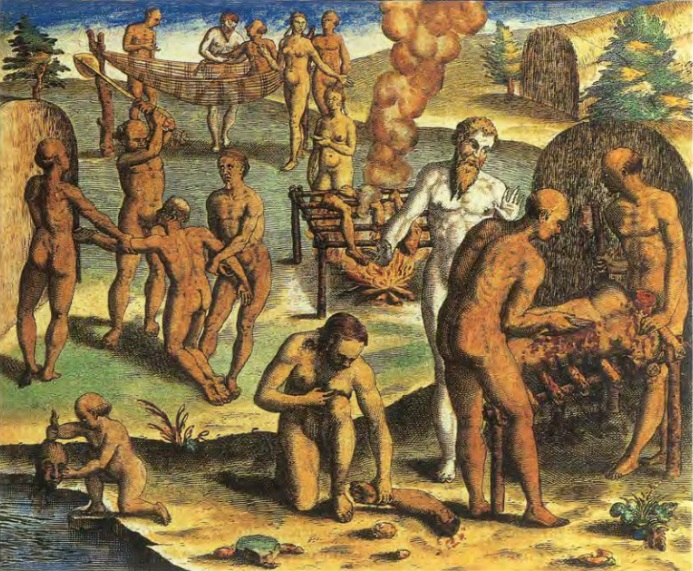
Enemies being killed and roasted in South America – engraving by Theodor de Bry (1592)

Cultures that are known or said to have practised exocannibalism include the Azande, the Lendu, and the Songye (especially the Zappo Zaps) in Central Africa, the Batak and Dayak people in Asia, and the Attacotti in Europe.

In North America, such practices are on record for the Iroquois, Nuu-chah-nulth (Nootka), Ancestral Puebloans (Anasazi), and the Aztecs; in South America, for the Tupinambá, the Wariʼ, and the Mapuche.

Cultures of Oceania that at some point practised such customs include the Marquesans, Mianmin, Asmat, Fijians, and the Maori.

=== Wariʼ ===
The Wariʼ people of South America are known for having practised both endo- and exocannibalism. Endocannibalism served as a form of recognition and respect for the dead. Exocannibalism, on the other hand, was part of warfare. While the Wariʼ had very separate motives for performing each of these modes of cannibalism, both shared the same basic steps of roasting and then eating the flesh.

If given the chance, Wariʼ warriors killed members of enemy groups. They then consumed their dead bodies, deliberately treating them in this way as a group of prey. They viewed warfare cannibalism as a form of predation or hunting and used exocannibalism as a means by which to label their enemies as subhuman. Enemies were processed and eaten in the same way as animals and the Wariʼ did not see an essential distinction between the killing and eating of enemies and of animals, instead grouping their enemies among the "animals" that could be legitimately killed for food.

Cannibal practices continued until the 1960s.

=== Fiji ===
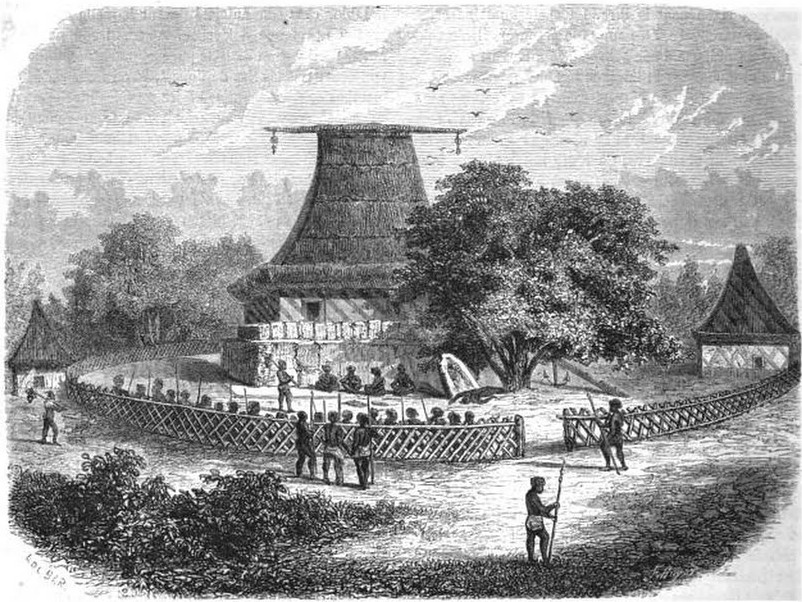
Scene from outside a bure kalou (temple) with a victim about to be consumed – drawing by Alexandre de Bar (c. 1860)

In Fiji, exocannibalism was for a long time widely accepted as a cultural practice, though the exact reasons for this practice are sometimes hard to determine, because most reports come from European observers rather than the participants themselves. From Fijian legend, the development of the island was due to a god who brought with him cannibalism and warfare. When he arrived on the island, he then married into the single indigenous family. That family then populated the island.

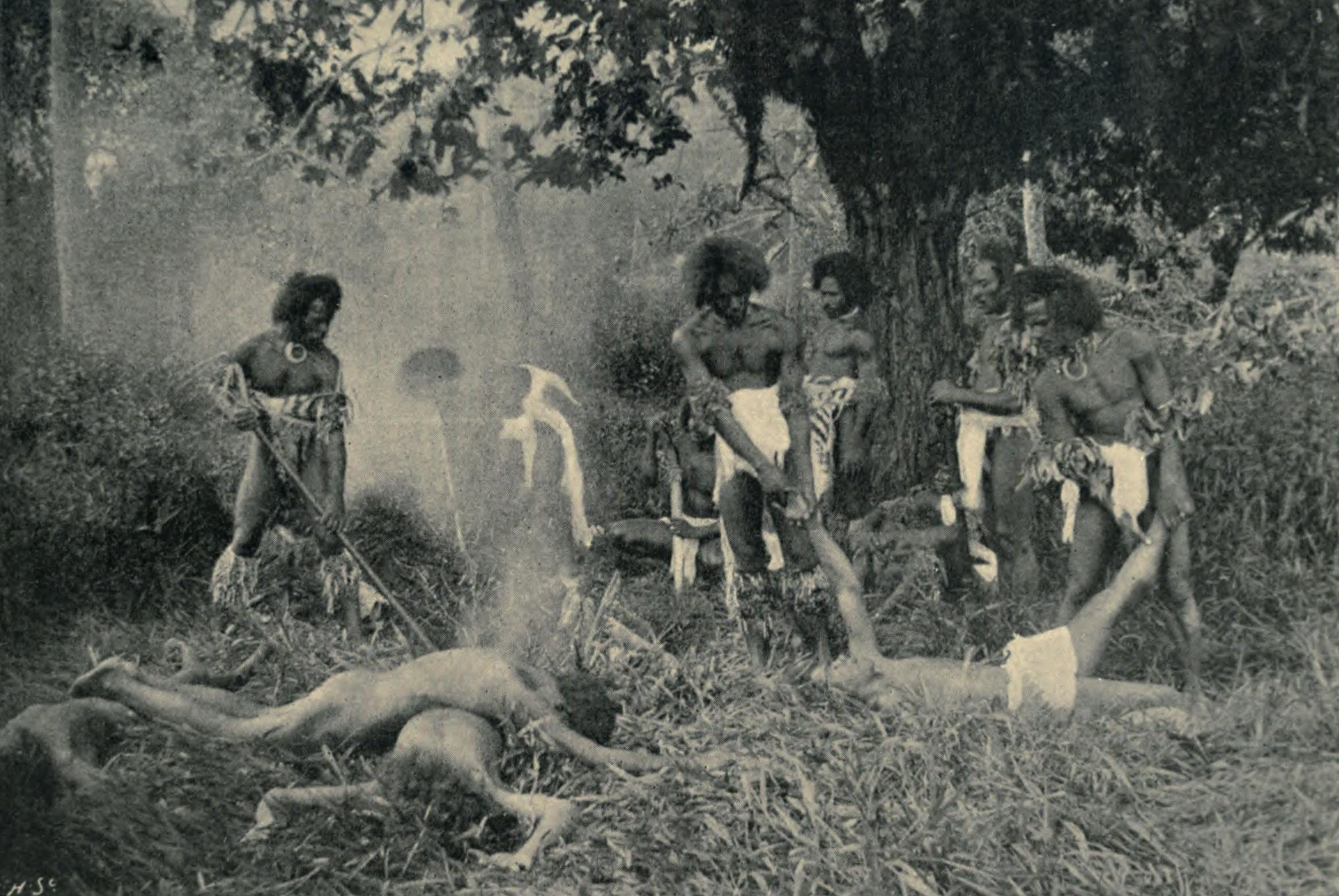
A re-enactment from c. 1895 of a cannibal feast that supposedly actually happened in Fiji in 1869

This legend continued to shape the actual practice of cannibalism. During wartime, chiefs were able to have their pick of the enemy warriors and soldiers who were killed, seeking out the most famous of those slain. Those of the killed enemies that the chief did not want would be consumed by the common people. The consumption of dead enemies was not practised out of need; instead it served as a means by which to assert one's power and superiority over the vanquished foe. Consumption of human flesh was not viewed as a forbidden or shameful act, but was instead regarded as an act of dining with the gods or dining on the food of gods.

While the flesh of slain enemies was consumed to express domination over them, cannibalism was also a part of both political and religious rituals performed by the Fijian people. It persisted in Fiji because of cultural beliefs embracing it. In contrast to European values, cannibal customs were an integral part of the local lifestyle and world view, not something that was controversial or shunned.

== See also ==
- Cannibalism in Africa
- Cannibalism in Asia
- Cannibalism in Europe
- Cannibalism in Oceania
- Cannibalism in the Americas
- Child cannibalism
- List of incidents of cannibalism
