= Endocannibalism =

Practice of eating the flesh of a human being from the same community

Endocannibalism is a practice of cannibalism in one's own locality or community. In most cases this refers to the consumption of the remains of the deceased in a mortuary context.

== As a cultural practice ==
Herodotus (3.38) mentions funerary cannibalism among the Callatiae, a tribe of India.

Some South American indigenous cultures practiced endocannibalism in the past. The Amahuaca Indians of Peru picked particles of bone out of the ashes of a cremation fire, ground them with corn, and drank them as a kind of gruel. For the Wariʼ people in western Brazil, endocannibalism was an act of compassion where the roasted remains of fellow Wariʼ were consumed in a mortuary setting; ideally, the affines (relatives by marriage) would consume the entire corpse, and rejecting the practice would be offensive to the direct family members. Ya̧nomamö consumed the ground-up bones and ashes of cremated kinsmen in an act of mourning; this is still classified as endocannibalism, although, strictly speaking, "flesh" is not eaten. Such practices are generally not believed to have been driven by need for protein or other food.

== Medical implications ==
Kuru is a type of transmissible spongiform encephalopathy (TSE) caused by prions that are found in humans. Human prion diseases come in sporadic, genetic, and infectious forms. Kuru was the first infectious human prion disease discovered. It spread through the Fore people of Papua New Guinea, among whom relatives consumed the bodies of the deceased to return the "life force" of the deceased to the hamlet. Kuru was 8 to 9 times more prevalent in women and children than in men at its peak because, while the men of the village consumed muscle tissues, the women and children would eat the rest of the body, including the brain, where the prion particles were particularly concentrated. Historical research suggests the kuru epidemic may have originated around 1900 from a single individual who lived on the edge of Fore territory, and who is thought to have spontaneously developed some form of Creutzfeldt–Jakob disease, a related prion disease. Oral history records that cannibalism began within the Fore in the late 19th century. Research at University College London identified a gene that protects against prion diseases by studying the Fore people.

There is no known treatment to cure or even control kuru, though there were several programs investigating the disease funded by universities and national institutes, including by the National Institute of Neurological Disorders and Stroke (NINDS). This institute funded research into the genetic and cellular process behind the development and transmission of kuru and other TSE diseases. Since 2009, Kuru is extinct: the Fore people ceased practicing cannibalism around 1960, and the last known carrier of the Kuru prion died in 2009, eliminating the possibility of further transmission.

== Prehistory of endocannibalism controversy ==
Whether or not endocannibalism was commonplace through much of human prehistory remains controversial.

A team led by Michael Alpers, a lifelong investigator of kuru, found genes that protect against similar prion diseases were widespread, suggesting that such endocannibalism could have once been common around the world.

A genetic study with a range of authors published by the University College London in 2009 declared evidence of a "powerful episode" of natural selection in recent humans. This evidence is found in the 127V polymorphism, a mutation which protects against the kuru disease. In simpler terms, it would appear the kuru disease has affected all humans to the extent we have a specialised immune response to it. However, a study drawing from hundreds of resources in 2013 claims further that 127V derives from an ancient and widespread cannibalistic practice, not related to kuru specifically, but "kuru-like epidemics" which appeared around the time of the extinction of the Neanderthals who co-existed with humans. This allows the suggestion that cannibalistic practises may have caused diseases which killed the neanderthals, but not the humans because of the 127V resistance gene.

Cro-Magnons associated with the Magdalenian culture in the European late Upper Palaeolithic (~23–14,000 years ago) are suggested to have practiced funerary endocannibalism.

== List of cultures known for endocannibalism ==
South America:

- Amahuaca
- Mayoruna
- Tapuya
- Wariʼ
- Yanomami

Asia:

- Callatiae
- Aghori

Oceania:

- Fore

== See also ==
- Cannibalism in Africa
- Cannibalism in Asia
- Cannibalism in Europe
- Cannibalism in Oceania
- Cannibalism in the Americas
- Child cannibalism
- Exocannibalism
- List of incidents of cannibalism
