= Cannibalism in Oceania =

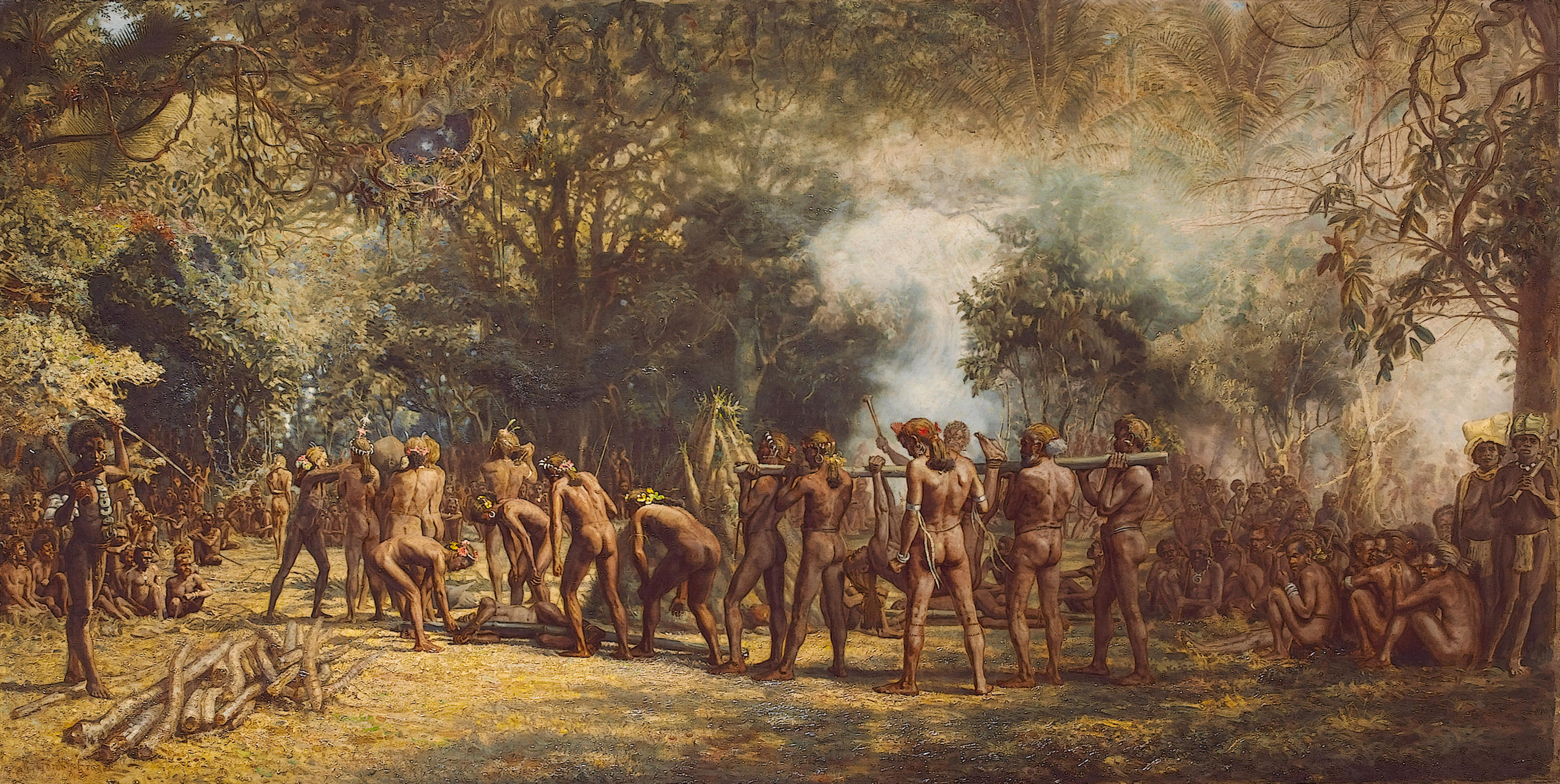
A cannibal feast on Tanna, Vanuatu, c. 1885–1889

Cannibalism in Oceania is well documented for many parts of this region, with reports ranging from the early modern period to, in a few cases, the 21st century. Some archaeological evidence has also been found. Human cannibalism in Melanesia and Polynesia was primarily associated with war, with victors eating the vanquished, while in Australia it was confined to a minority of Aboriginal groups and was mostly associated with mortuary rites or as a contingency for hardship to avoid starvation.

Cannibalism used to be widespread in parts of Fiji (once nicknamed the "Cannibal Isles"), among the Māori people of New Zealand, and in the Marquesas Islands. It was also practised in New Guinea and in parts of the Solomon Islands. According to some reports, cannibalism was still practised in Papua New Guinea around 2012, for cultural reasons.

== Australia ==
While scholars generally accept that some forms of cannibalism were practised by Aboriginal Australians, such acts were largely limited to certain regions such as the north-east of Queensland, the coast of Arnhem Land, and parts of Victoria, and were most often associated with mortuary rites. Cannibalism was also sometimes practised in times of famine. Reliable accounts of cannibalism mostly involve close kin eating specific parts of the dead in socially controlled rituals as a means of perpetuating the existence and attributes of the deceased. While there are accounts of some Aboriginal groups eating the flesh of very young infants, other close family members, and slain warriors and enemies, these groups generally did not kill others only in order to eat them.

It is likely that most Aboriginal groups did not practice any form of cannibalism. According to archaeologist Josephine Flood, "Aborigines generally abhorred cannibalism. Often an Aboriginal group would call their enemies cannibals and many myths were told of evil spirits that killed enemies for food." Nevertheless, funerary cannibalism of members of the Aboriginal group (known as endocannibalism) is frequently attested in some regions. Anthropologists Ronald Berndt and Catherine Berndt state, "it seems clear that burial cannibalism was fairly widespread, [though] in most cases ... only parts of the body were eaten."

Cannibalism was sometimes associated with infanticide. Berndt and Berndt state that infanticide was mainly practised during bad seasons in the desert and to restrict the number of young children. Killed infants were not always eaten, but when they were, it was often by a sibling to strengthen them or in the belief that the infant would be reborn. They note that the prevalence of cannibalism after infanticide was "grossly exaggerated" by some authors (such as Daisy Bates), but "underestimated" by others. In 1929, anthropologist Géza Róheim reported that in the past some Aboriginal groups of central Australia killed every second infant younger than about one as a means of population control. In times of drought and hunger children might be killed and eaten by their mothers and fed to older siblings to give them strength. Some of Róheim's female informants admitted having eaten the flesh of their siblings when young. Men sometimes killed older children in times of famine, but did not eat the flesh of children and sometimes punished women for doing so. Reports of cannibalism of infants exist for other regions including central Queensland and Victoria.

Cannibalism of people outside the social group (exocannibalism) is also recorded. For example, the Kurnai and Ngarigo of south-eastern Australia were reported to only eat their enemies.

Since the 1980s, scholars have been more critical of 19th century and early 20th century accounts of cannibalism. Anthropologist Michael Pickering surveyed the ethnographic literature in 1985 and concluded that 72% of accounts were unsourced or second hand and that there were no reliable eyewitness accounts of actual acts of cannibalism. Many accounts based on Aboriginal informants were of alleged acts of cannibalism by their enemies. He argues that language barriers and the belief of traditional Aboriginal groups in the reality of the Dreaming and of sorcerers and spirits who eat human flesh may have caused some European observers to misinterpret symbolic stories and metaphorical language as accounts of real acts of cannibalism. Pickering and Howie-Willis argue that mortuary rituals involving the cremation, smoking and drying of bodies, the stripping of flesh and bones, and the carrying of body parts as mementos and charms were likely assumed by some observers to be evidence of cannibalism. Pickering concludes that there is no reliable evidence of institutionalized cannibalism in Aboriginal culture, although some groups might have resorted to cannibalism in times of stress.

Pickering, Howie-Willis, and Behrendt argue that allegations of cannibalism were a means of demonizing Aboriginal people to justify the expropriation of their land, denial of their legal rights, and destruction of their culture. Behrendt states that accounts describing Aboriginal cannibalism are "sketchy at best", adding that the most reliably documented cases of cannibalism in colonial Australia were the acts of the European convicts Alexander Pearce, Edward Broughton, and Matthew Maccavoy.

== Melanesia ==
In parts of Melanesia, cannibalism was still practised in the early 20th century, for a variety of reasons – including retaliation, to insult an enemy people, or to absorb the dead person's qualities.

=== New Guinea ===
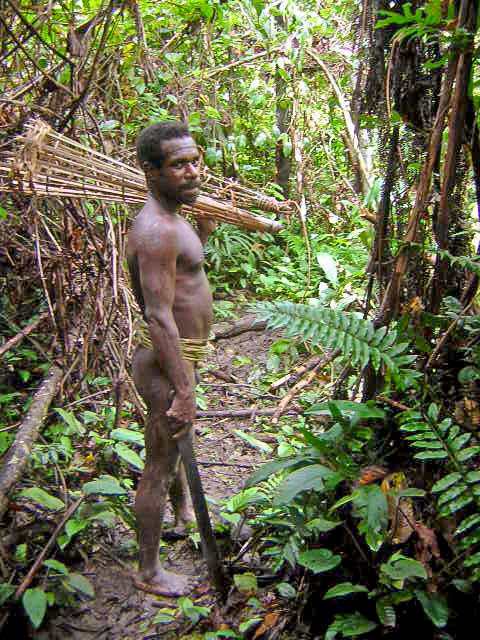
Korowai people of New Guinea practised cannibalism until very recent times

As in some other New Guinean societies, the Urapmin people engaged in cannibalism in war. Notably, the Urapmin also had a system of food taboos wherein dogs could not be eaten and they had to be kept from breathing on food, unlike humans who could be eaten and with whom food could be shared.

The Korowai tribe of south-eastern Papua could be one of the last surviving tribes in the world engaging in cannibalism.

A local cannibal cult killed and ate victims as late as 2012.

=== Fiji ===
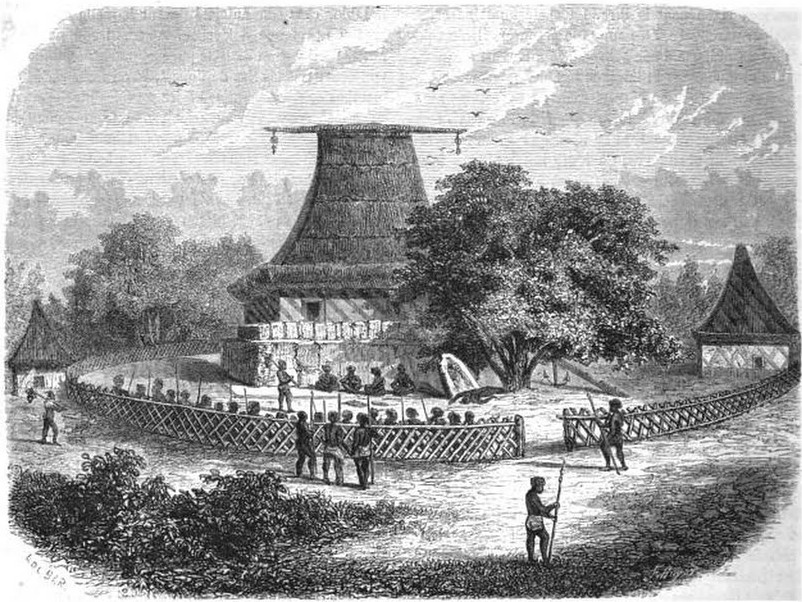
Scene from outside a Fijian bure kalou (temple) with a victim about to be consumed – drawing by Alexandre de Bar (c. 1860)

Fiji was nicknamed the "Cannibal Isles" by European sailors, who avoided disembarking there. Multiple accounts indicate that in some parts of the archipelago human flesh was eaten unhesitatingly and with "relish". In the 1830s, missionaries spoke with people who had been present at feasts where dozens – in some cases up to 50 – "baked human beings" were served and consumed, and they heard from persons they considered credible of even larger such feasts. The usual victims were vanquished enemies, captured foreigners, or slaves purchased from other regions. Men, women, and children were all consumed, with female flesh and that of children typically preferred.

Ratu (chief) Udre Udre of Rakiraki is believed to be one of history's most prolific cannibals, with different sources attributing between 99 and 999 victims to him before his death in 1840. Guinness World Records identifies him as the world's most prolific cannibal and gives his victim count as 872 to 999.

In 1839, a missionary witnessed how 20 dead men, women, and children were sent to Rewa as presents from the inhabitants of Verata after a successful war campaign. He heard that a total of 260 persons had been killed and distributed for eating. Among the eaten were dozens of children killed cruelly by hanging them upside down from the mastheads of double-hull druas, causing their bodies to repeatedly dash against the mast until they were dead; a practice also reported from other war campaigns.

In 1846, another missionary reported that after a successful war campaign against Rewa, the small island of "Bau literally stank for many days, human flesh having been cooked in every hut and the entrails having been thrown outside as food for pigs, or left to putrefy in the sun." According to contemporary estimates, more than 300 inhabitants of Rewa were killed and roasted, with some of the human flesh discarded because there was too much to consume. The English missionary John Hunt estimated that during the first five years of his stay on Viwa Island, at least 500 people were eaten within 15 miles of his residence – an average of two per week. A Wesleyan missionary recorded exact victim counts for nine cannibal feasts held between February 1843 and May 1844 in the vicinity of his station on Taveuni. At five of them, only one person was consumed, while the others claimed between three and "near 50" victims; in total, nearly 80 individuals were eaten at these feasts.

Roasted human beings, called "long pigs", were preferred to actual pigs for eating. In some cases human bodies were roasted whole in earth ovens; in others they were cut up and stewed in large earthenware pots. The consumption of human flesh was considered natural, with people seeing nothing reprehensible about eating enemies or outsiders. Because the eaten were often enemies vanquished in war, eating human rather than animal meat was considered a marker of strength and superiority. Some observers and anthropologists note that large mammals were rare in Fiji and cite the scarcity of animal meat as one reason cannibalism could become accepted and widespread. Chief Seru Epenisa Cakobau once rejected a criticism of local eating habits by arguing that Westerners had "plenty of beef" to eat, while Fijians had "no beef but men".

The particular prestige of human flesh also extended outside a war context, as indicated by various accounts that children and adults were kidnapped and sent to "distinguished individual[s]" as "a special gesture", to be consumed by the recipient and their friends. Observers reported that infants, children, and young women were sent as such human tributes for the ovens of powerful chiefs by those who wanted to "propitiate" them or gain their favours.

In the 1860s, the missionary Thomas Baker was killed and eaten together with six christened Fijians, reportedly after breaking a taboo involving a local chief.

== Polynesia ==
=== New Zealand ===
The first encounter between Europeans and Māori may have involved cannibalism of a Dutch sailor. In June 1772, the French explorer Marc-Joseph Marion du Fresne and 26 members of his crew were killed and eaten in the Bay of Islands. In an 1809 incident known as the Boyd massacre, about 66 passengers and crew of the Boyd were killed and eaten in Whangaroa, Northland.

Cannibalism was a regular practice in Māori wars. In one instance, on 11 July 1821, warriors from the Ngāpuhi tribe killed 2,000 enemies and remained on the battlefield "eating the vanquished until they were driven off by the smell of decaying bodies".

Between 1835 and 1866, members of the Māori cannibalized hundreds during the genocide of the Moriori people on the Chatham Islands. According to lists later assembled by Moriori elders, around 300 men, women, and children were killed – and in many cases eaten – immediately after the invasion. The surviving Moriori population was enslaved; in each of the following years some of the enslaved were killed and consumed. The scholar Edward Tregear was shown a beach at Waitangi where dozens of Moriori women had been impaled for spit-roasting, and he heard of a large feast held by a leading Māori chief in 1836 where six children had been killed, cooked, and served. After slaughtering Moriori slaves, chiefs used to send some of the flesh to neighbouring groups as a gesture of hospitality. Only 100 Moriori out of an original population of about 1,700 survived this period.

Māori warriors fighting the New Zealand government in Tītokowaru's War on the North Island in 1868–1869 revived ancient rites of cannibalism as part of a radical interpretation of the Pai Mārire religion. Australian cultural anthropologist Russ Bowden wrote that:

Apart from the passing European ..., Maori cannibalism, like its Aztec counterpart, was practised exclusively on traditional enemies – i.e., on members of other tribes and hapuu. To use the jargon, the Maori were exo- rather than endocannibals. By their own account, they did it for purposes of revenge: to kill and eat a man was the most vengeful and degrading thing one person could do to another."

Bowden added that, "in addition to eating the bodies of enemies slain in battle", injuries "could be avenged ... by digging up a corpse belonging to the offender's group and eating it." He described a case where a newly buried member of an enemy group was exhumed, cooked, and eaten, while the bones were made into "utensils".

Historian Paul Moon agrees that the corpses of enemies were eaten out of rage and in order to humiliate them. But in his interpretation, cannibalism extended over time beyond this original humiliation ritual into an occasional luxury and an expedient measure to extend one's food supply. Māori myths and other evidence he considers indicate a clear distinction: while eating relatives was wrong, killing and eating unrelated others, including enemies and slaves, was seen as morally acceptable and normal. A host who served his guests and friends the flesh of slaves or captives was generous, not depraved. Moon has criticized other historians for ignoring Māori cannibalism or even claiming that it never happened, despite an "overwhelming" amount of evidence to the contrary.

Margaret Mutu, professor of Māori studies at the University of Auckland, agreed that "cannibalism was widespread throughout New Zealand" and that "it was part of our [Māori] culture", but warned that it can be hard for non-Māori to correctly understand and interpret such customs due to a lack of contextual knowledge, without elaborating on what knowledge they might lack.

=== Marquesas Islands ===
The dense population of the Marquesas Islands, in what is now French Polynesia, was concentrated in narrow valleys, and consisted of warring tribes, who sometimes practised cannibalism on their enemies. Human flesh was called "long pig". Rubinstein writes:

It was considered a great triumph among the Marquesans to eat the body of a dead man. They treated their captives with great cruelty. They broke their legs to prevent them from attempting to escape before being eaten, but kept them alive so that they could brood over their impending fate ... With this tribe, as with many others, the bodies of women were in great demand.

When a feast was held, the victims chosen for consumption where "spitted on long poles that entered between their legs and emerged from their mouths" so they could be roasted whole.

Archaeologists on Nuku Hiva, the largest Marquesas Island, uncovered the partially eaten remains of a young child roasted whole in an earth oven dating to the 14th century or earlier, indicating cannibalism at least as far back as that time.

== See also ==
- Alexander Pearce, Irish criminal who confessed to practising cannibalism while on the run in Australia
- Asmat people, a Papuan group with a reputation of cannibalism
- Cannibalism in Africa
- Cannibalism in Asia
- Cannibalism in Europe
- Cannibalism in the Americas
- Child cannibalism
- List of incidents of cannibalism

== Works cited ==
- Behrendt, Larissa (2016). Finding Eliza: Power and Colonial Storytelling. St Lucia, Queensland: University of Queensland Press. ISBN 978-0-7022-5390-4.
- Berndt, Ronald M.; Berndt, Catherine H. (1977). The World of the First Australians (2 ed.). Sydney: Ure Smith. ISBN 978-0-7254-0272-3.
- Biber, Katherine (2005). "Cannibals and Colonialism". Sydney Law Review. 27 (4).
- Constantine, Nathan (2006). A History of Cannibalism: From Ancient Cultures to Survival Stories and Modern Psychopaths. Edison, New Jersey: Chartwell Books. ISBN 978-0-7858-2158-8.
- Cowlishaw, Gillian (1978). "Infanticide in Aboriginal Australia". Oceania. 48.
- Flood, Josephine (2006). The Original Australians: the Story of the Aboriginal People (1st ed.). Allen & Unwin. ISBN 1-74114-872-3.
- Hogg, Garry (1958). Cannibalism and Human Sacrifice. London: Robert Hale.
- Howie-Willis, Ian (1994). "Cannibalism". In Horton, David (ed.). The Encyclopaedia of Aboriginal Australia. Vol. I. Canberra: Aboriginal Studies Press. ISBN 0-85575-249-1.
- McCarthy, Frederick (1957). Australia's Aborigines: Their Life and Culture. Melbourne: Colorgravure.
- Pickering, Michael (1999). "Consuming Doubts: What Some People Ate? Or What Some People Swallowed?". In Goldman, Laurence R. (ed.). The Anthropology of Cannibalism. Bergin & Garvey. ISBN 0-89789-596-7.
- Róheim, Géza (1976). Children of the Desert: The Western Tribes of Central Australia. Vol. 1. New York: Harper & Row.
- Rubinstein, William D. (2014). Genocide: A History. New York: Routledge. ISBN 978-0-582-50601-5.
- Sahlins, Marshall (1983). "Raw Women, Cooked Men, and Other 'Great Things' of the Fiji Islands". In Brown, Paula; Tuzin, Donald (eds.). The Ethnography of Cannibalism. Washington, D.C.: Society of Psychological Anthropology. pp. 72–93.
- Siefkes, Christian (2022). Edible People: The Historical Consumption of Slaves and Foreigners and the Cannibalistic Trade in Human Flesh. New York: Berghahn Books. ISBN 978-1-80073-613-9.
