= Joeli Bulu =

Tongan missionary (c. 1810–1877)

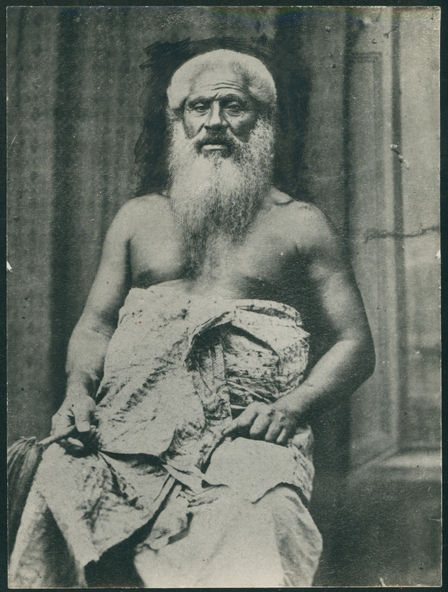
- Joeli Bulu as an elder.
- Born: c. 1810
- Died: 7 May 1877
- Occupations: Teacher, Missionary
- Known for: Leading missionaries in the Church of Fiji

Joeli Bulu (Siaoeli Pulu) (c. 1810 – May 7, 1877) was a Tongan missionary who had become a Christian in 1833. He was one of a band of teachers who came to Fiji in 1838, and pioneered the work of the Christian Church in this group. He served the Church in Fiji for almost four decades. Many others were great in the same way. Paula Vea, another dynamic Christian missionary, was a contemporary of his.

== Life ==
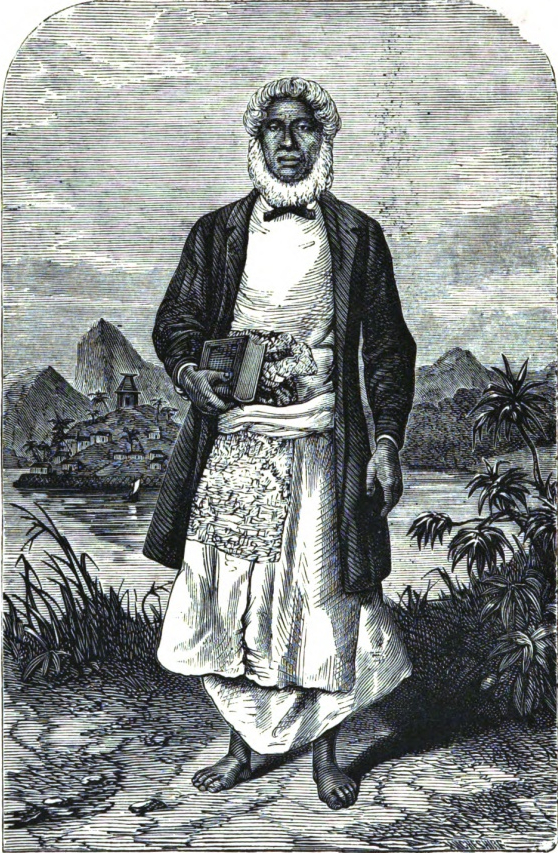
Illustration from his 1871 biography.

Joeli Bulu led a team sent by King George of Tonga to spread the Church in Fiji. Joeli was converted and called to preach in Tonga and later ‘called’ to Fiji. He came to Lakeba by canoe, and was appointed to help with the printing of catechisms and passages of Scriptures. Regarding his decision to convert to Christianity, Bulu remarked, "I will lotu (accept Christ as my Saviour) so that I may live among the stars". This became the title of a book, To Live Among the Stars: Christian Origins in Oceania, by John Garrett.

Lorimer Fison translated Bulu's oral account of his life. This was edited by George Stringer Rowe and printed in England in 1871 as Joel Bulu: The Autobiography of a Native Minister in the South Seas. It contains his adventures in fires, storms, wars and floods, including some miraculous escapes. Some believe that he was a ‘chosen vessel’ protected by Providence in no ordinary way. Despite many near-death experiences, he served a 40-year ministry.

He served first at Lakeba and then at Rewa, and after that the station was closed because of the wars, at Viwa. John Hunt sent him to investigate possibilities of establishing the work in Vanua Levu, and to that field he was later appointed. He was the first Pacific islander to be placed alone in charge of a circuit, Ono, in 1848. In 1850, he was also the first to be ordained as a Native Assistant Missionary. After this he served at Nadi (Vanua Levu), Bua and Cakaudrove where he pioneered the work before any white missionaries were established there. When the Cakaudrove station was finally established Joeli was found in charge of an institution for training catechists. Afterwards he was appointed to Bau, where he served as Cakobau's own chaplain.

== Death ==
Bulu died in May 1877. His grave is beside that of John Hunt at Viwa Island. He came to Fiji from his own land and gave himself wholly, and finally found his grave with the sons of her own soil.

== Legacy ==
The Lelean Memorial School, a Methodist run school at Davuilevu, Nausori, Fiji honours his name by naming one its four houses after him.

== Sources ==
- Bulu, Joel & G.S.R., 1871, Joel Bulu: The Autobiography of a Native Minister in the South Seas.
- Garrett, John, 1982, To Live Among the Stars: Christian origins in Oceania, World Council of Churches in association with the Institute of Pacific Studies of the University of the South Pacific, Geneva/Suva.
- Tippett, A.R., 1954, The Christian (Fiji 1835–1867), Auckland Institute and Museum, Auckland.
