= Joeli =

Joeli is a masculine and feminine given name. Notable people with the name include:

- Joeli Bulu, Fijian Christian missionary
- Joeli Cawaki, Fijian politician
- Joeli Lutumailagi (born 1985), Fijian rugby union player
- Joeli Veitayaki (born 1967), Fijian rugby union player
- Joeli Vidiri (born 1973), Fijian rugby union player
