= Kauda (cannibal) =

Cannibal character in Sikh tradition

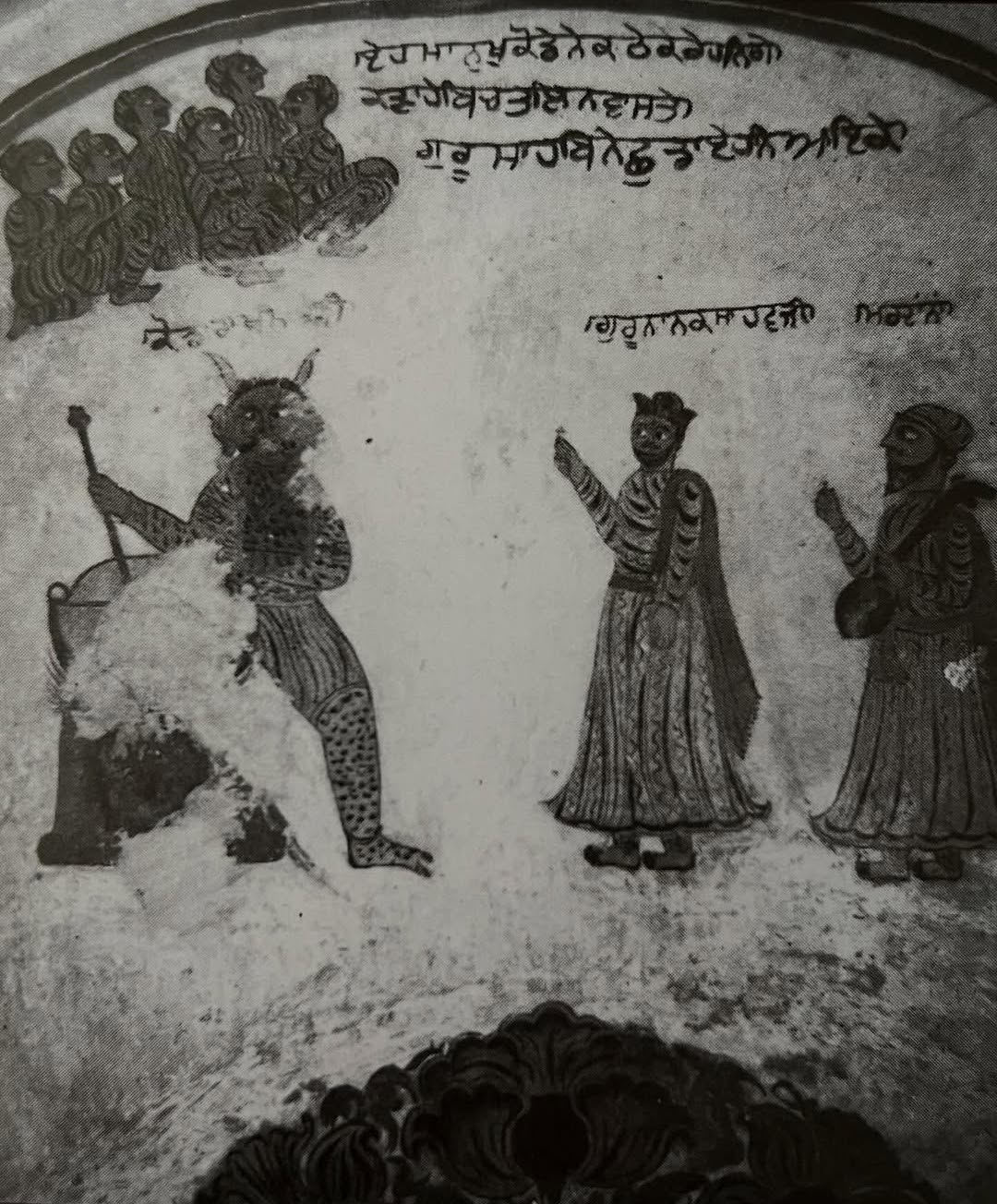
Mural depicting Guru Nanak and his companions encountering the cannibal Kauda, from Gurdwara Lohgarh, Dina

Kauda (Kauḍā) also known as Koda Rakshash, is a character that appears in all four major Janamsakhi traditions of the Sikhs. The story occurred during Nanak's second udasi (travel-tour). As per the traditions, Kauda was a cannibal and a yogi belonging to the Kāpālikas sect who used to capture and eat humans. According to the Bala Janamsakhi tradition (the only one that names the figure), Kauda captured Bhai Mardana and was going to cook him in a cauldron but was stopped from doing-so by Guru Nanak, with Kauda surrendering to the guru. The event supposedly occurred in a place called Dhanasari Des. One theory believes Kauda belonged to the Bhil tribe. The mythology of the Gond tribe of Central India features a demon named Koda or Kodi that captured their ancestor Lingo.

== See also ==
- Rakshasa
