= History of the Marquesas =

This article details the history of the Marquesas. The Marquesas Islands are a group of volcanic islands in French Polynesia, an overseas collectivity of France in the southern Pacific Ocean. The Marquesas Islands comprise one of the five administrative divisions of French Polynesia.

== Prehistory ==
The first recorded settlers of the Marquesas were Polynesians. Based on a variety of archæological evidence, researchers at one time believed they arrived between 100-600 A.D. This is well documented on the creation myth legend of Hawaiiloa, Ki and Kanaloa. Ethnological and linguistic evidence suggests that a second wave likely arrived from the western region of Tonga.

A 2010 study using revised, high-precision radiocarbon dating suggested that the period of eastern Polynesian colonization took place much later, in a shorter time frame of two waves: the "earliest in the Society Islands A.D. ~1025–1120, four centuries later than previously assumed; then after 70–265 y, dispersal continued in one major pulse to all remaining islands A.D. ~1190–1290." This rapid colonization is believed to account for the "remarkable uniformity of East Polynesia culture, biology and language." As of 2014, the initial settlement date for the islands has been pushed back slightly to around 900–1000 A.D.

== European exploration ==
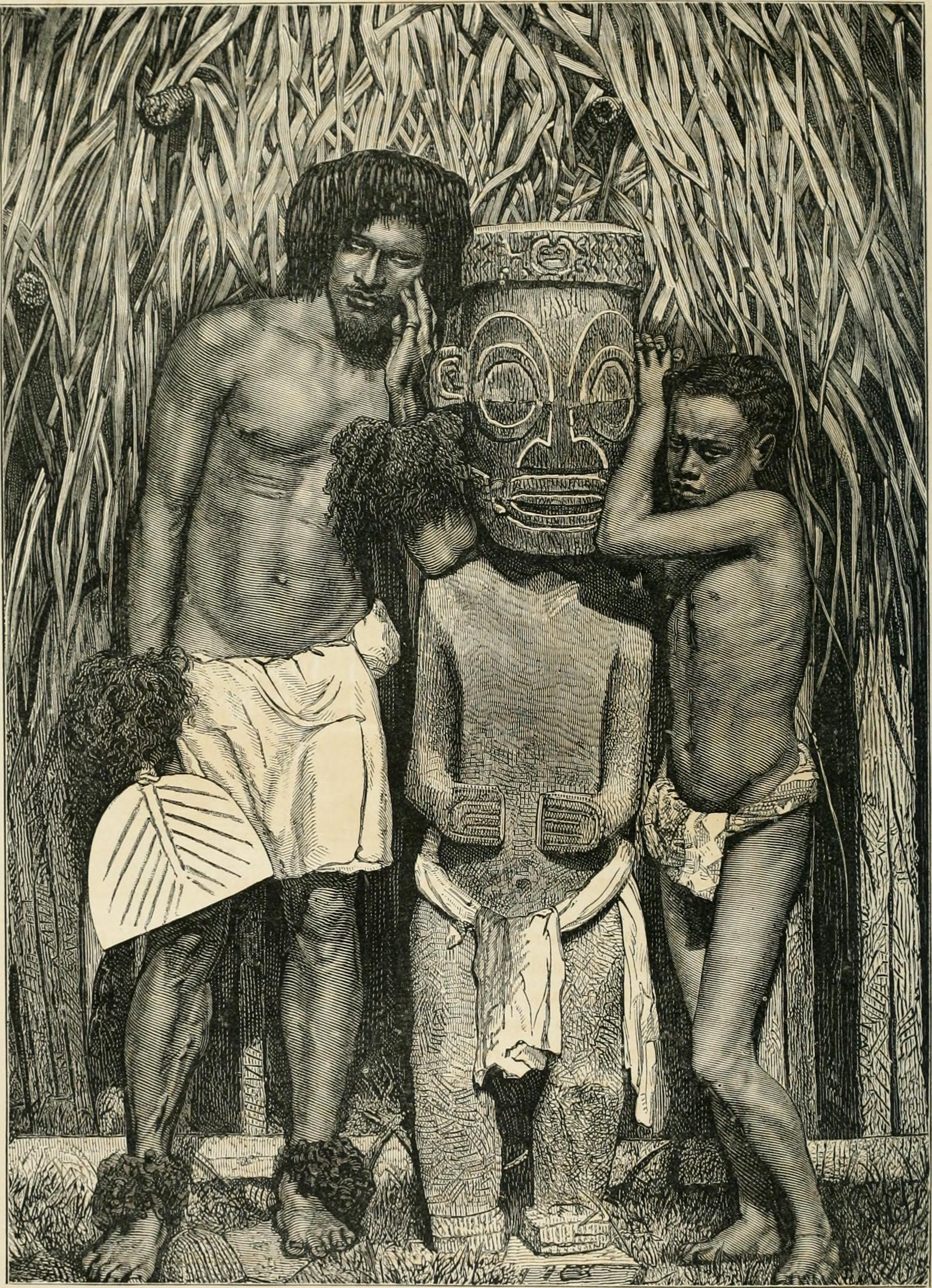
1876

The islands were given their name by the Spanish explorer Álvaro de Mendaña de Neira who reached them on 21 July 1595. He named them after his patron, García Hurtado de Mendoza, 5th Marquis of Cañete, who was Viceroy of Peru at the time. Mendaña visited first Fatu Hiva and then Tahuata before continuing on to the Solomon Islands. De Neira also discovered an ancient cross on one of the islands. Historians have speculated that this may have marked the grave of a sailor from San Lesmes, a Spanish vessel which disappeared in a storm during García Jofre de Loaísa's expedition through the region in 1526.

The American navigator Capt. Joseph Ingraham first visited the northern Marquesas while commanding the brig Hope in 1791, giving them the name Washington Islands. In 1813, Commodore David Porter claimed Nuku Hiva for the United States, but the United States Congress never ratified that claim.

A sperm whale on 20 November 1820 rammed and sank the United States whaler Essex near the Marquesas Islands. Forced to take refuge in three small boats, the crew avoided the Marquesas because of having heard reports of cannibalism among the island's inhabitants. Instead the crew turned east toward South America, much farther away. Many died, and the survivors resorted to cannibalism to reach the end of their three-month-long voyage.

In 1842, France, following a successful military operation on behalf of a native chief (named Iotete) who claimed to be king of the whole of the island of Tahuata, took possession of the whole group, establishing a settlement (abandoned in 1859) on Nuku Hiva. French re-established control over the group in 1870, and later incorporated into the territory of French Polynesia. Paul Gauguin and other French artists traveled to the Marquesas Islands and other areas of Polynesia in the 19th century to live and work at his art. The islands were regularly visited by whaling and trading ships of various nations.

Of all the major island groups of the Pacific, the Marquesas Islands suffered the greatest population decline as a result of Eurasian endemic diseases carried by European explorers, which resulted in epidemics, particularly of smallpox, to which they had no acquired immunity. The estimated 16th-century population of over 100,000 inhabitants, was reduced to about 20,000 by the middle of the nineteenth century, and to just over 2,000 by the beginning of the 1900s. During the course of the twentieth century, the population began to revive, increasing to about 8,500 by 2002, not including the Marquesan community residing on Tahiti. It has continued to increase since then.

== See also ==
- Austronesian peoples
