= Viwa Island =

Island in Fiji

Coordinates: 17.1379°S 176.9292°E

Viwa
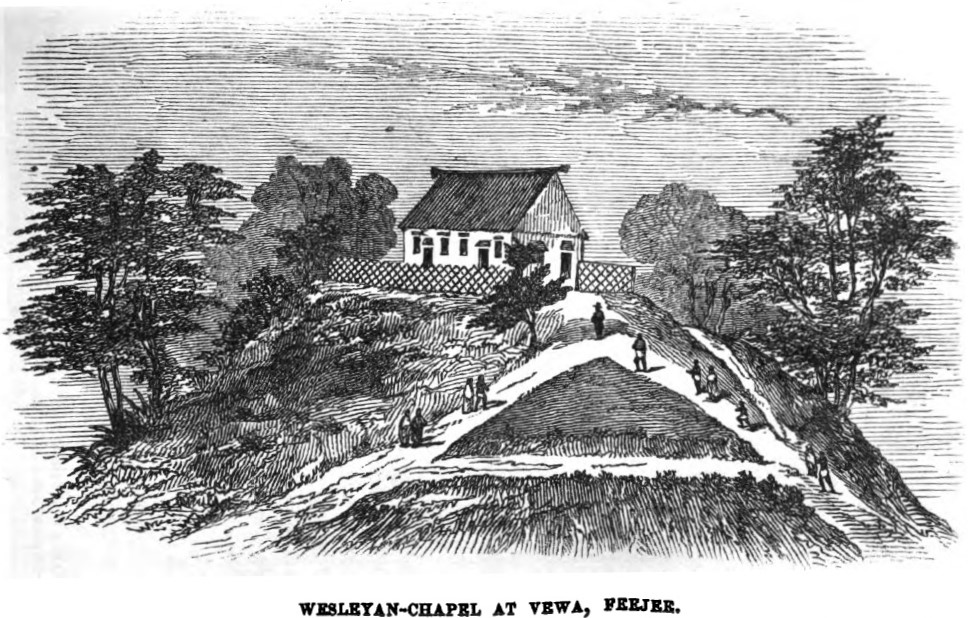
- Wesleyan Chapel at Viwa, 1850

- Location within Fiji

Geography
- Location: South Pacific Ocean
- Archipelago: Yasawa Islands

Administration
- Fiji
- Division: Eastern
- Province: Ba
- Tikina: Naviti

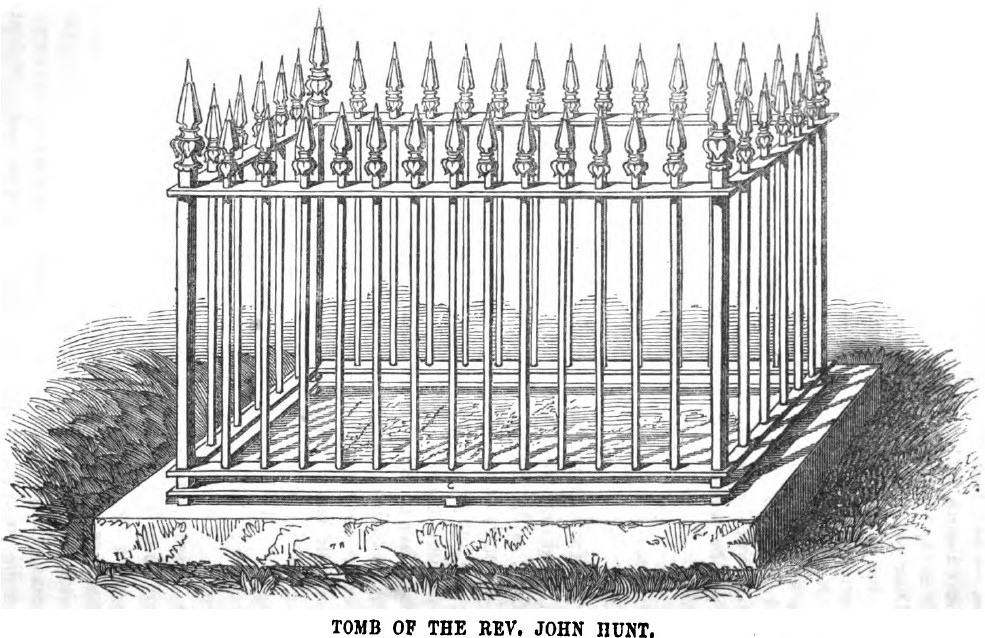
Tomb of Rev. John Hunt, 1850

Viwa Island, Yasawa is located approximately 70 km (40 mi) northwest of Denarau situated in the Yasawa Islands of Fiji.

There is also an island named Viwa to the east of Viti Levu.

The geological rock type of the island contributes to its national significance as outlined in Fiji's Biodiversity Strategy and Action Plan.

The island is surrounded by a blossoming rich colourful coral reef that is abundant with a variety of aquatic life, making it a fantastic location for diving, fishing, snorkeling and other water sports with a white sandy beach and crystal clear turquoise water. The island's first inhabitants were the Yaukuve from Nalauwaki, Waya who settled in Naibalebale. The I Cavuti Vakavanua is Werelevu I Taiti, Na Momo na Tui Viwa. It is the island for the surfer Isei Tokovou. The three villages are Naibalebale, Yakani and Najia. Naibalebale is the capital of Viwa as the headship of the Vanua is in it. Mataqali Veruku, inside Tokatoka Veruku is the leading Tokatoka where the Turaga ni Yavusa, thus the Tui Viwa is chosen from.

It was during Semisi Ravusou, a Tongan, that leads the people of Viwa and when he died, he gave the position back to the clan of Maikeli Vukuwale. Maikeli Vukuwale was from Nalauwaki, Waya the son of Malanicagi Masau the former Tui Waya. Malanicagi Masau was out on his visit to Viwa when they appoint a Sau at Yalobi and he was very angry and was appointed Sau at his own village of Nalauwaki.

The arrival of the Yavusa Yaukuve from Nalauwaki leave them the establishment right over all those that came later such as those from Vunatawa, Naviti, Vunatoto and those from Nadi. The last to arrive at Naibalebale was those from Yalobi and Nadi- Vacai.

A living testimony within Viwa is that there is no other Yavu near Naibalebale rather than Yawalevu and Viwa is a qali of Waya and not Naviti.

The island has its own primary school and nursing station. The islanders are facing transport problem as they do not have any consistent transport service to their island.
