= John Hunt (missionary) =

Englis missionary to Fiji (1812–1848)

The Reverend John Hunt
- Born: 13 June 1812; Hykeham Moor, England
- Died: 4 October 1848 (aged 36); Viwa Island, Fiji
- Occupation: Missionary
- Spouse: Hannah Summers (m. 1838; died 1848)

Ecclesiastical career
- Religion: Christianity (Methodism)
- Ordained: 1838

John Hunt (13 June 1812 – 4 October 1848) was an English missionary known for converting Fijian cannibals to Methodism.

== Early life ==
Hunt was born on 13 June 1812 in Hykeham Moor, near Lincoln, England, as the third child of a farm bailiff and his wife, both of whom were illiterate. A serious bout of brain fever at age 16 inspired Hunt to "begin to serve God there and then"; upon recovering he started attending a Methodist chapel and converted to Methodism shortly after. While continuing to work at the farm in the day, Hunt also preached to the rural congregation at church, with whom he found much favour in spite of his "somewhat ungainly appearance".

== Career ==
In September 1835, hoping to become a missionary in Africa, Hunt began going to a seminary in Hoxton where he studied Greek and Latin and read Christian tracts including Explanatory Notes Upon the New Testament by John Wesley and Self-Knowledge by John Mason. In February 1838, following the arrival of two Methodist missionaries in Fiji and their subsequent account of rampant cannibalism on the island, Hunt was requested by the Wesleyan Mission House to join the Fijian mission alongside other Methodists like James Calvert. Initially reluctant to accept the offer for fear of leaving his longtime sweetheart Hannah Summers behind, Hunt soon began confirming his travel arrangements after she agreed to accompany him; they got married on 6 March 1838 at Newton on Trent, Lincolnshire. Hunt and his fellow Fiji-bound missionaries were ordained on 27 March in Hackney, London, and departed for Sydney, Australia on 29 April, arriving on 24 August. The missionaries stayed in Australia for two months, leaving on 25 October with London missionary John Williams, who was headed for Erromango. The Fiji party arrived at Lakemba on 22 December 1838. Hunt and his wife were promptly posted to Rewa; they arrived at Rewa on 7 January 1839 and received an audience with the King of Rewa on the same day.

After weeks of studying the native language, Hunt delivered his first sermon in Rewa on 18 February 1839; by 18 March, he was able to give two or three sermons a week. After about five months in Rewa, Hunt began translating the New Testament from Greek to Fijian. On 29 July 1839, at the request of the King of Rewa, and together with another missionary and their wives, Hunt established a mission at Somosomo. They were cordially received and allowed to reside at one of King Tuithakau's residences; however, they were less successful in converting the Somosomo natives to Christianity. After three years in Somosomo, Hunt and his wife set sail for Viwa Island, arriving on 30 August 1842; unlike in Somosomo, many Viwa natives were already nominal or practising Christians, and Hunt managed to convert several others, not least the Queen of Viwa.

== Later years ==
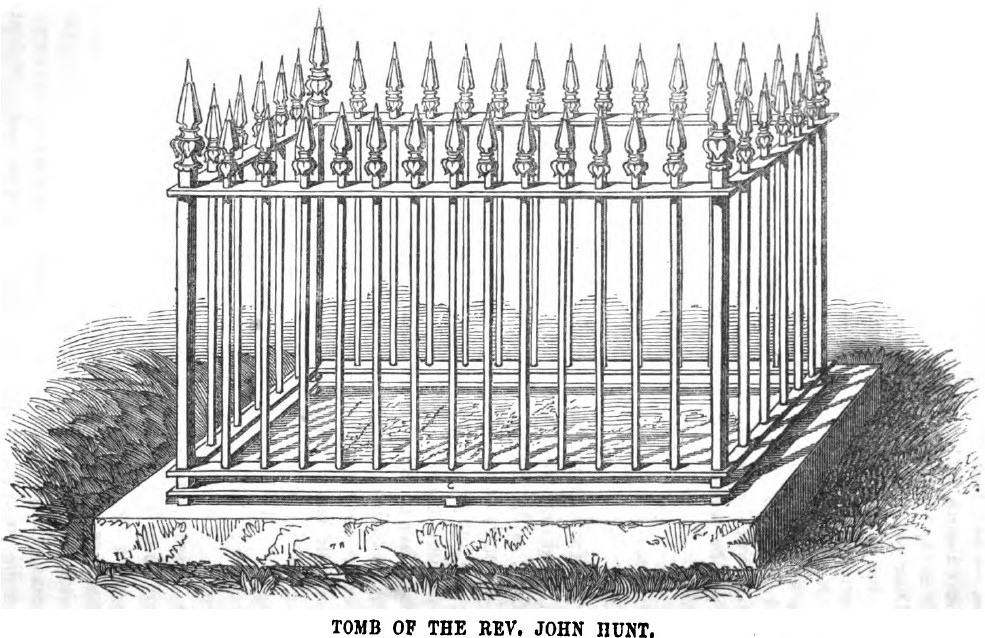
Tomb of John Hunt in Viwa Island.

Hunt spent the last six years of his life in Viwa Island; despite his relatively young age and "iron strength", the rigours of missionary life nonetheless took a toll on his health. Hunt died on 4 October 1848, at the age of 36. The cause of death was reportedly dysentery, which was common in Fiji at the time. As he lay on his deathbed, in the company of his wife and James Calvert, Hunt exclaimed, "Lord, bless Fiji! Save Fiji!" He then spoke his final words: "I want strength to praise Him abundantly! Hallelujah."
