= Cannibalism in Europe =

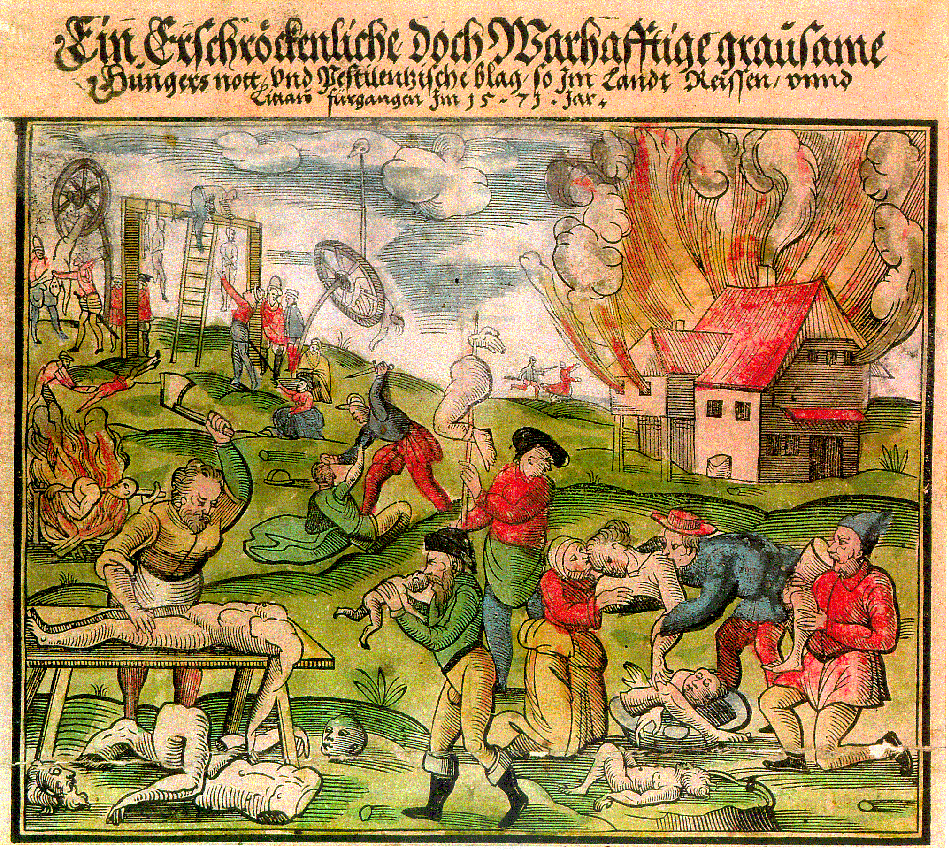
Cannibalism in Lithuania during the Livonian War in 1571 (German plate)

Acts of cannibalism in Europe seem to have been relatively prevalent in prehistory but also occurred repeatedly in later times, often motivated by hunger, hatred, or medical concerns. Both anatomically modern humans and Neanderthals practised cannibalism to some extent in the Pleistocene, and Neanderthals may have been eaten by modern humans as the latter spread into Europe. Amongst humans in prehistoric Europe, archaeologists have uncovered many clear and indisputable sites of cannibalism, as well as numerous other finds of which cannibalism is a plausible interpretation.

In antiquity, several Greek and Roman authors mentioned cannibal customs in remote parts of the continent, such as beyond the Dnieper River and in Britain. The Stoic philosopher Chrysippus noted that burial customs varied widely, with funerary cannibalism being practised by many peoples, though rejected by the Greeks. Several cases of survival cannibalism during sieges are on record. Cannibalism to stave off starvation was also practised in later times, such as during the Great Famine of 1315–1317. In the early modern and colonial era, shipwrecked sailors ate the bodies of the deceased or drew lots to decide who would have to die to provide food for the others in cases of cannibalism at sea.

During the First Crusade, some crusaders ate the bodies of killed enemies, with the reasons for these acts (hunger or intimidation) being a matter of debate. Various cases of undoubtedly revenge-driven cannibalism took place in early modern Italy. In 1672, the Dutch statesman Johan de Witt and his brother were lynched and partially eaten by an angry mob. In early modern Europe, the consumption of body parts and blood for medical purposes became popular. Reaching its height during the 17th century, this practice continued in some cases into the second half of the 19th century.

The first half of the 20th century saw a resurgence of acts of survival cannibalism in Eastern Europe, especially during the Russian famine of 1921–1922, the Soviet famine of 1930–1933, and the siege of Leningrad. Several serial killers, among them Karl Denke and Andrei Chikatilo, consumed parts of their victims. A few other people, such as reporter William Seabrook and artist Rick Gibson, ate human flesh out of curiosity or to shock the public, without killing anyone for the purpose. At the start of the 21st century, Armin Meiwes became infamous for killing and eating a voluntary victim, whom he had found via the Internet.

== Prehistory ==
There is archaeological evidence that cannibalism has been practised for at least hundreds of thousands of years by early Homo sapiens and archaic hominins. Some anthropologists, such as Tim D. White, suggest that cannibalism was common in human societies before the beginning of the Upper Paleolithic period. This theory is based on the large amount of "butchered human" bones found in Neanderthal and other Lower/Middle Paleolithic sites.

It seems likely that not all instances of prehistoric cannibalism were due to the same reason, just as cannibalistic acts known from the historical record have been motivated by a variety of reasons. One suggested reason for cannibalism in the Lower and Middle Paleolithic has been food shortages. It has also been suggested that removing dead bodies through ritual (funerary) cannibalism was a means of predator control, aiming to eliminate predators' and scavengers' access to hominid (and early human) bodies. Jim Corbett proposed that after major epidemics, when human corpses are easily accessible to predators, there are more cases of man-eating leopards, so removing dead bodies through ritual cannibalism (before the cultural traditions of burying and burning bodies appeared in human history) might have had practical reasons for hominids and early humans to control predation.

The oldest archaeological evidence of hominid cannibalism comes from the Gran Dolina cave in northern Spain. The remains of several individuals who died about 800,000 years ago and may have belonged to the Homo antecessor species show unmistakable signs of having been butchered and consumed in the same way as animals whose bones were also found at the site. They belong to at least eleven individuals, all of which were young (ranging from infancy to late teenhood). Later additional cannibalized human remains were found, including from a young child (aged two to five) who was butchered about 850,000 years ago and "processed like any other prey", as cut marks show.

A study explains the finds in the cave as due to "nutritional" cannibalism, where individuals belonging to hostile or unrelated groups were hunted, killed, and eaten much like animals. Based on the placement and processing of human and animal remains, the authors conclude that cannibalism was likely a "repetitive behavior over time as part of a culinary tradition", not caused by starvation or other exceptional circumstances. They suggest that young individuals (more than half of which were children under ten) were targeted because they "posed a lower risk for hunters" and because this was an effective means for limiting the growth of competing groups.

Neanderthal remains from the Goyet Caves dated to 40,500–45,500 BP in Belgium contain cracked bones, cut marks, and other indicators of processing for food. Reindeer remains from the same site have the same butcher marks. Furthermore, some bones were utilized as bone tools. This event occurred before the arrival of anatomically modern humans in Europe and thus shows unambiguous evidence of Neanderthal cannibalism in Northern Europe. Several sites in Croatia, France, and Spain yield further evidence that the Neanderthals sometimes practised cannibalism, though the interpretation of some of these finds remains controversial.

Neanderthals could also fall victim to cannibalism by anatomically modern humans. Evidence found in southwestern France indicates that the latter butchered and ate a Neanderthal child about 30,000 years ago; it is unknown whether the child was killed by them or died of other reasons. The find has been considered as strengthening the conjecture that modern humans might have hunted Neanderthals and, in this way, contributed to their extinction.

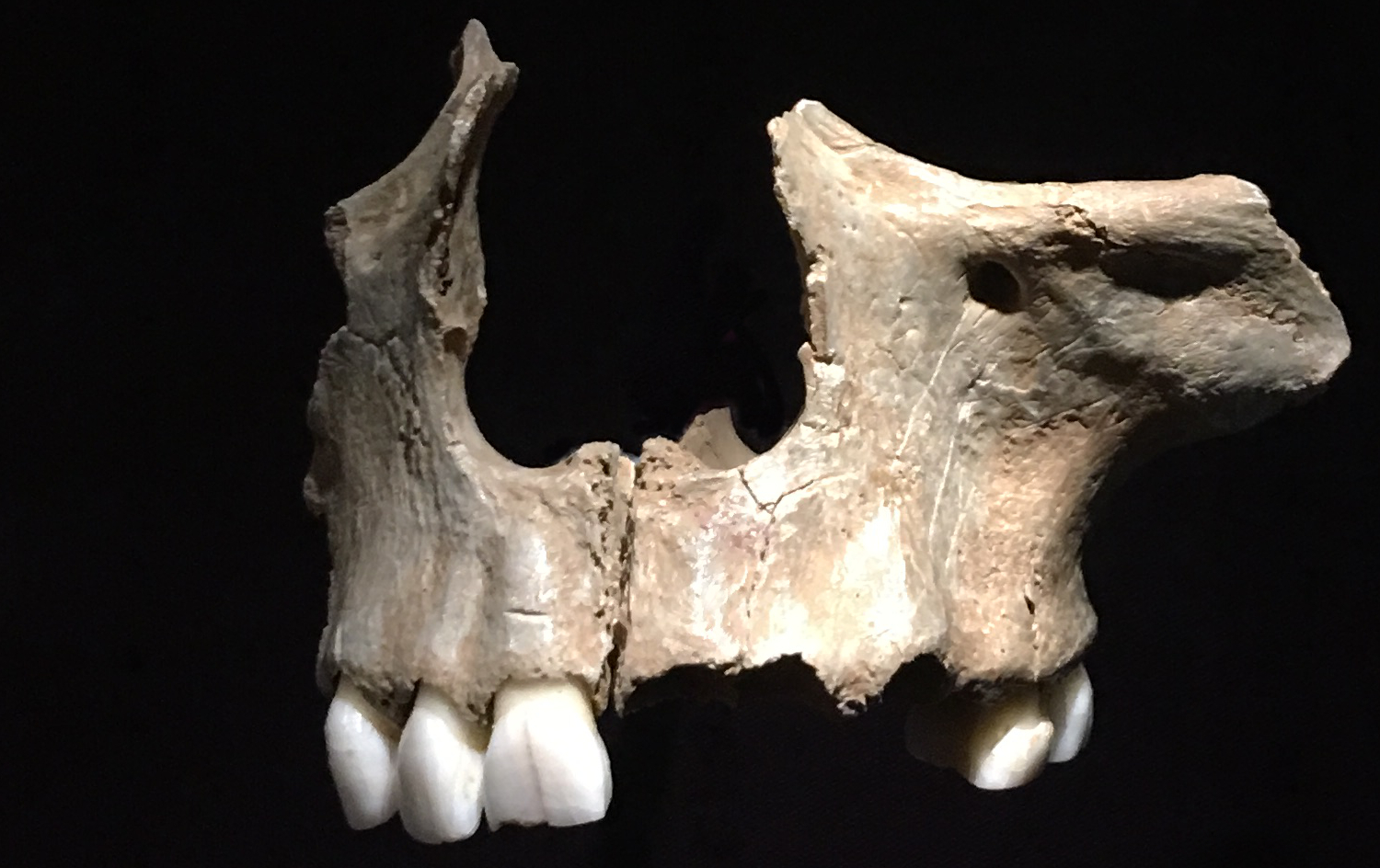
A maxilla from Gough's Cave with cut marks near the teeth

In Gough's Cave, England, remains of human bones and skulls, around 14,700 years old, suggest that cannibalism took place amongst the people living in or visiting the cave, and that they may have used human skulls as drinking vessels. The Magdalenian culture appears to have extensively practised cannibalism, with human remains showing clear evidence of such a treatment found in more than a dozen sites spanning from western to eastern Europe. One suggested explanation is that the dead were eaten in peaceful funerary rituals.

However, evidence from Maszycka Cave in southern Poland (today part of Ojców National Park) has put this interpretation in doubt. Human remains from 18,000 years ago found in this cave indicate that Magdalenian hunter-gatherers systematically consumed human flesh at that time. Both human and animal remains were processed in the same way for apparently nutritional purposes and then discarded together, making a funerary rite unlikely. The archaeologists exploring the cave therefore consider violence between competing groups the more likely explanation, with defeated enemies eaten either out of convenience or in order to symbolically humiliate them.

Human bones of the Mediterranean Mesolithic uncovered in Castell de Castells, Spain that were dated from 10,200–9,000 years ago show clear marks of human teeth chewing on them. It is unclear if the event was motivated by ritual, food stress, or something else. Nineteen of the bones show burn marks from cooking, apparently after the meat was removed but before the bones were broken down. Furthermore, human feces uncovered inside the cave contained fragments of human bones.

The archaeological site of Herxheim in southwestern Germany was a ritual center and a mass grave formed by people of the Linear Pottery culture in Neolithic Europe. It contained the scattered remains of more than 1000 individuals from different, in some cases faraway regions, who died around 5000 BCE. Whether they were war captives or human sacrifices is unclear, but the evidence indicates that their corpses were spit-roasted whole and then consumed.

At Fontbrégoua Cave in southeastern France, the remains of six people who lived about 7,000 years ago were found (two children, one adolescent, and three adults), in addition to animal bones. The patterns of cut marks indicate that both humans and animals were skinned and processed in similar ways. Since the human victims were all processed at the same time, the primary excavator, Paola Villa, suspects that they all belonged to the same family or extended family and were killed and butchered together, probably during some violent conflict. Others have argued that the traces were caused by defleshing rituals preceding a secondary burial, but the fact that both humans and wild and domestic animals were processed in the same way makes this unlikely; moreover, Villa argues that the observed traces better fit a typical butchering process than a secondary burial.

In 2001, archaeologists at the University of Bristol speculated that a human femur dating from the late Iron Age discovered in a cave in Gloucestershire, South West England may have been fractured for the purposes of marrow extraction. However, later analysis showed that the treatment of the remains was consistent with more general Iron Age mortuary practices and presented almost no evidence for cannibalism.

== Early history ==
Cannibalism is mentioned many times in early history and literature. Herodotus claimed in his Histories (5th century BCE) that after eleven days' voyage up the Borysthenes (Dnieper River) one reached a desolated land that extended for a long way, followed by a country of man-eaters (other than the Scythians), and beyond it by another desolated and uninhabited area.

The Stoic philosopher Chrysippus approved of eating one's dead relatives in a funerary ritual, noting that such rituals were common among many peoples.

According to Appian, during the Roman siege of Numantia in the 2nd century BCE, the population of Numantia (in today's Spain) was reduced to cannibalism and suicide. Cannibalism was also reported by Josephus during the siege of Jerusalem in 70 CE.

Jerome, in his letter Against Jovinianus (written 393 CE), discusses how people came to their present condition as a result of their heritage and lists several examples of peoples and their customs. In the list, he mentions that he has heard that the Attacotti (in Britain) eat human flesh and that the Massagetae and Derbices (two Central Asian peoples) kill and eat old people, considering this a more desirable fate than dying of old age and illness.

== Middle Ages ==
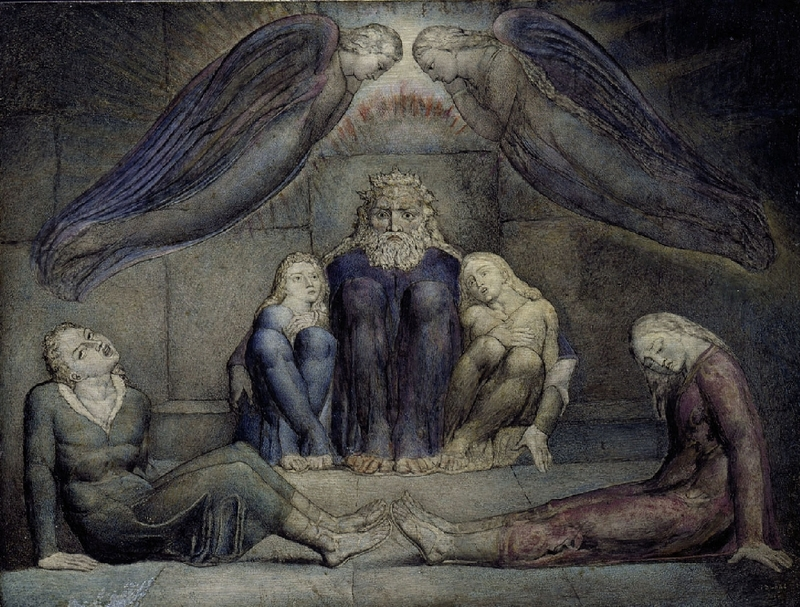
Ugolino and his sons in their cell, as painted by William Blake. According to Dante, the prisoners were slowly starved to death, and before dying, Ugolino's children begged their father to eat their dead bodies to survive.

Cases of cannibalism were recorded during the First Crusade, as there are various accounts of European crusaders consuming the bodies of their dead opponents following the sieges of Antioch and of Ma'arra in 1097–1098. While the Christian sources all explain these acts as due to hunger, Amin Maalouf is sceptical of this justification, arguing that the crusaders' behaviour indicates they might have been driven by "fanaticism" rather than, or in addition to "necessity". Thomas Asbridge states that, while the "cannibalism at Marrat is among the most infamous of all the atrocities perpetrated by the First Crusaders", it nevertheless had "some positive effects on the crusaders' short-term prospects", since reports of their brutality convinced many Muslim commanders to accept truces rather than trying to fight them.

During the Great Famine of 1315–1317, there were various reports of cannibalism among starving people.

== Early modern and colonial era ==
Various cases of revenge-driven cannibalism are on record. The historian Angelica Montanari has investigated several accounts from Italy between the 14th and 16th centuries, showing that the consumption of entrails or body parts of those considered enemies is repeatedly mentioned in local chronicles, sometimes without any expression of condemnation or disapproval. Another case of this type of cannibalism happened in 1672 when Dutch stadtholder Johan de Witt and his brother Cornelis were lynched and partially eaten for failing to fend off a French invasion. The brothers were attacked by members of The Hague's civic militia, who shot them and left them to the mob. Their naked, mutilated bodies were strung up on the nearby public gibbet while the Orangist mob triumphantly roasted and ate their livers. Throughout it all, the mob maintained a remarkable discipline, lending doubt as to the event's spontaneity.

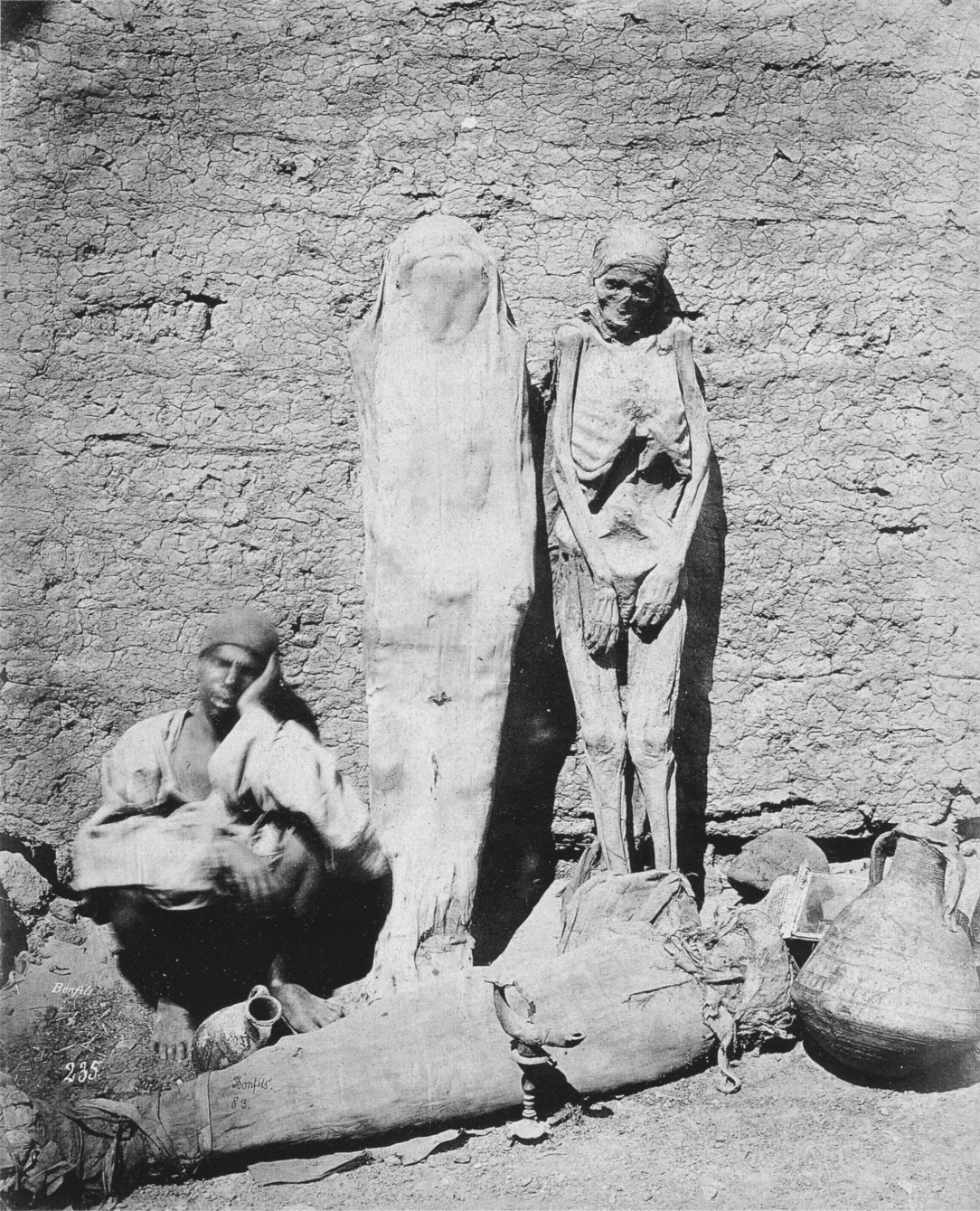
Egyptian mummy seller in 1875

From the 16th century on, an unusual form of medical cannibalism became widespread in several European countries, for which thousands of Egyptian mummies were ground up and sold as medicine. Powdered human mummies – called mummia – were thought to stop internal bleeding and have other healing properties. The practice developed into a widespread business that flourished until the early 18th century. The demand was much higher than the supply of ancient mummies, leading to much of the offered "mummia" being counterfeit, made from recent Egyptian or European corpses – often from the gallows – instead. In a few cases, mummia was still offered in medical catalogues in the early 20th century.

Sailors shipwrecked or lost at sea repeatedly resorted to cannibalism at sea to stave off starvation. The survivors of the sinking of the French ship Méduse in 1816 resorted to cannibalism after four days adrift on a raft. Their plight was made famous by Théodore Géricault's painting Raft of the Medusa. After a whale sank the Essex of Nantucket on November 20, 1820, the survivors, in three small boats, resorted, by common consent, to cannibalism for some to survive. This event became an important source of inspiration for Herman Melville's Moby-Dick.

The case of R v Dudley and Stephens (1884) is an English criminal case which dealt with four crew members of an English yacht, the Mignonette, who were cast away in a storm some 2,600 kilometres (1,600 mi) from the Cape of Good Hope. After several days, one of the crew, a seventeen-year-old cabin boy, fell unconscious due to a combination of the famine and drinking seawater. The others (one possibly objecting) decided to kill him and eat him. They were picked up four days later. Two of the three survivors were found guilty of murder. A significant outcome of this case was that necessity in English criminal law was determined to be no defence against a charge of murder. This was a break with the traditional understanding among sailors, which had been that selecting a victim for killing and consumption was acceptable in a starvation situation as long as lots were drawn so that all faced an equal risk of being killed.

== Early 20th century to present ==
=== World War II ===
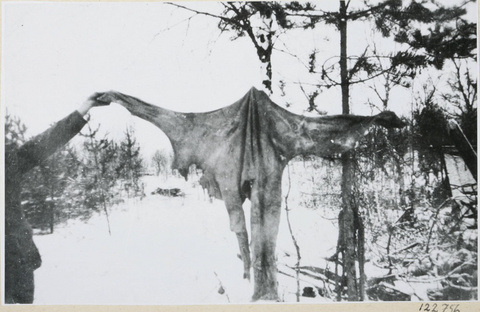
Finnish soldiers show the skin of Soviet soldiers eaten by members of a Soviet patrol during the Continuation War

Many instances of cannibalism by necessity were recorded during World War II. For example, during the 872-day siege of Leningrad, reports of cannibalism began to appear in the winter of 1941–1942, after all birds, rats, and pets were eaten by survivors. Leningrad police even formed a special division to combat cannibalism.

About 2.8 million Soviet prisoners of war died in Nazi custody in less than eight months during 1941–42. According to the United States Holocaust Memorial Museum, by the winter of 1941, "starvation and disease resulted in mass death of unimaginable proportions". This deliberate starvation led to many incidents of cannibalism.

Following the Soviet victory at Stalingrad, it was found that some German soldiers in the besieged city were cut off from supplies and resorted to cannibalism. Later, following the German surrender in January 1943, roughly 100,000 German soldiers were taken prisoner of war (POW). Almost all of them were sent to POW camps in Siberia or Central Asia, where, due to being chronically underfed by their Soviet captors, many resorted to cannibalism. Fewer than 5,000 of the prisoners taken at Stalingrad survived their captivity.

Cannibalism took place in the concentration and death camps in the Independent State of Croatia (NDH), a Nazi German puppet state which was governed by the fascist Ustasha organization, responsible for the Genocide of Serbs and the Holocaust in NDH. Several survivors testified that some of the Ustashas drank the blood from the slashed throats of victims.

=== Central and Western Europe ===
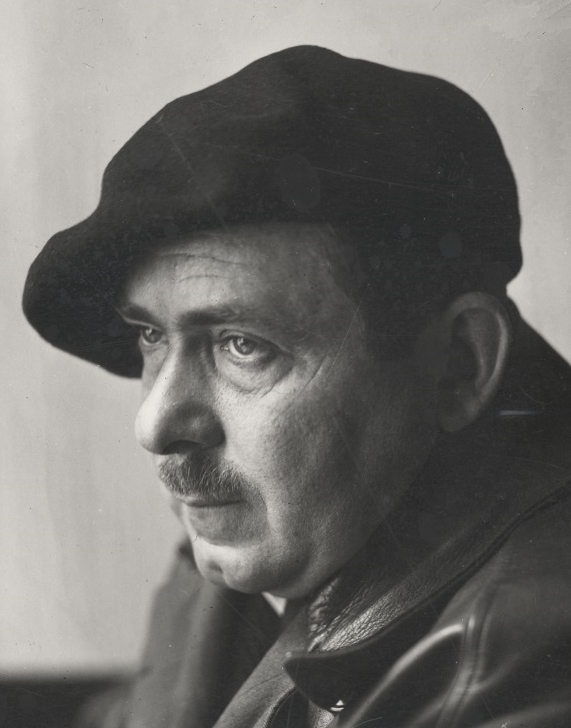
William Seabrook, American journalist and cannibal

Before 1931, The New York Times reporter William Seabrook, apparently disappointed that he had been unable to taste human flesh in West Africa, obtained from a hospital intern at the Sorbonne a chunk of this meat from the body of a healthy man killed in an accident, then cooked and ate it. He reported,

It was like good, fully developed veal, not young, but not yet beef. It was very definitely like that, and it was not like any other meat I had ever tasted. It was so nearly like good, fully developed veal that I think no person with a palate of ordinary, normal sensitiveness could distinguish it from veal. It was mild, good meat with no other sharply defined or highly characteristic taste such as for instance, goat, high game, and pork have. The [rump] steak was slightly tougher than prime veal, a little stringy, but not too tough or stringy to be agreeably edible. The [loin] roast, from which I cut and ate a central slice, was tender, and in color, texture, smell as well as taste, strengthened my certainty that of all the meats we habitually know, veal is the one meat to which this meat is accurately comparable.

Karl Denke, possible Carl Großmann and Fritz Haarmann, as well as Joachim Kroll were German murderers and cannibals active between the early 20th century and the 1970s. Armin Meiwes is a former computer repair technician who achieved international notoriety for killing and eating a voluntary victim in 2001, whom he had found via the Internet. After Meiwes and the victim jointly attempted to eat the victim's severed penis, Meiwes killed his victim and proceeded to eat a large amount of his flesh. He was arrested in December 2002. In January 2004, Meiwes was convicted of manslaughter and sentenced to eight years and six months in prison. Despite the victim's undisputed consent, the prosecutors successfully appealed this decision, and in a retrial that ended in May 2006, Meiwes was convicted of murder and sentenced to life imprisonment.

On July 23, 1988, Rick Gibson ate the flesh of another person in public. Because England does not have a specific law against cannibalism, he legally ate a canapé of donated human tonsils in Walthamstow High Street, London. A year later, on April 15, 1989, he publicly ate a slice of human testicle. When he tried to eat another slice of human testicle as "hors d'oeuvre" at the Pitt International Galleries in Vancouver on July 14, 1989, the police confiscated the testicle. However, the charge of publicly exhibiting a disgusting object was dropped. Two months later, he finally ate the piece of human testicle on the steps of the Vancouver courthouse.

In 2008, a British model called Anthony Morley was imprisoned for the killing, dismemberment and partial cannibalisation of his lover, magazine executive Damian Oldfield.

=== Eastern Europe and the Soviet Union ===
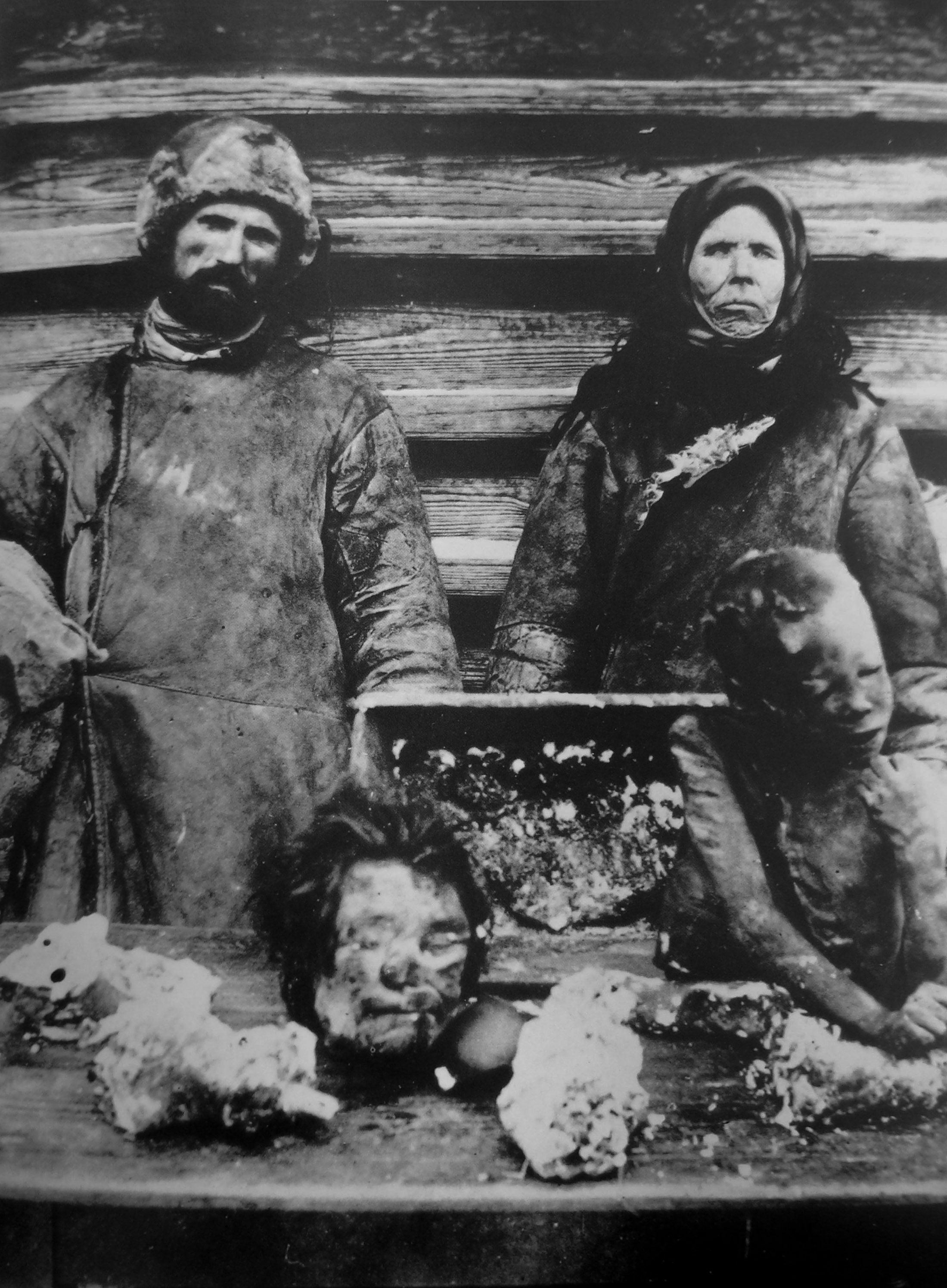
Cannibalism during the Russian famine of 1921–1922

In his book, The Gulag Archipelago, Soviet writer Aleksandr Solzhenitsyn described cases of cannibalism in 20th-century Soviet Union. Of the famine in Povolzhie (1921–1922) he wrote: "That horrible famine was up to cannibalism, up to consuming children by their own parents – the famine, which Russia had never known even in the Time of Troubles [in 1601–1603]".

The historian Orlando Figes observes that "thousands of cases" of cannibalism were reported, while the number of cases that were never reported was doubtless even higher. In Pugachyov, "it was dangerous for children to go out after dark since there were known to be bands of cannibals and traders who killed them to eat or sell their tender flesh." An inhabitant of a nearby village stated: "There are several cafeterias in the village – and all of them serve up young children." This was no exception – Figes estimates "that a considerable proportion of the meat in Soviet factories in the Volga area ... was human flesh." Various gangs specialized in "capturing children, murdering them and selling the human flesh as horse meat or beef", with the buyers happy to have found a source of meat in a situation of extreme shortage and often willing not to "ask too many questions".

Cannibalism was also widespread during the Holodomor, a man-made famine in Soviet Ukraine between 1932 and 1933.

Survival was a moral as well as a physical struggle. A woman doctor wrote to a friend in June 1933 that she had not yet become a cannibal, but was "not sure that I shall not be one by the time my letter reaches you". The good people died first. Those who refused to steal or to prostitute themselves died. Those who gave food to others died. Those who refused to eat corpses died. Those who refused to kill their fellow man died. ... At least 2,505 people were sentenced for cannibalism in the years 1932 and 1933 in Ukraine, though the actual number of cases was certainly much higher.

Most cases of cannibalism were "necrophagy, the consumption of corpses of people who had died of starvation". But the murder of children for food was common as well. Many survivors told of neighbours who had killed and eaten their children. One woman, asked why she had done this, "answered that her children would not survive anyway, but this way she would". The police arrested her. The police also documented cases of children being kidnapped, killed, and eaten, and "stories of children being hunted down as food" circulated in many areas. When nearly all grain and all kinds of animal meat had been exhausted, "a black market arose in human flesh", and it "may even have entered the official economy." The police kept a close eye on butcher shops and slaughterhouses, trying to prevent them from bringing human flesh into circulation. The Italian consul, Sergio Gradenigo, nevertheless reported from Kharkiv that the "trade of human meat becomes more active."

In March 1933, the secret police in Kiev Oblast collected "ten or more reports of cannibalism every day" but concluded that "in reality there are many more such incidents", most of which went unreported. Those found guilty of cannibalism were often "imprisoned, executed, or lynched". But while the authorities were well informed about the extent of cannibalism, they also tried to suppress this information from becoming widely known; the chief of the secret police warned "that written notes on the subject do not circulate among the officials where they might cause rumours".

The Holodomor was part of the Soviet famine of 1930–1933, which also devastated other parts of the Soviet Union in the early 1930s. Multiple cases of cannibalism were also reported from Kazakhstan.

A few years later, starving people again resorted to cannibalism during the siege of Leningrad (1941–1944). About this time, Solzhenitsyn writes: "Those who consumed human flesh, or dealt with the human liver trading from dissecting rooms ... were accounted as the political criminals".

Of the building of the Northern Railway Labor Camp ("Sevzheldorlag"), Solzhenitsyn reports, "An ordinary hard-working political prisoner almost could not survive at that penal camp. In the camp Sevzheldorlag (chief: colonel Klyuchkin) in 1946–47 there were many cases of cannibalism: they cut human bodies, cooked and ate."

The Soviet journalist Yevgenia Ginzburg was a long-term political prisoner who spent time in the Soviet prisons, Gulag camps and settlements from 1938 to 1955. She described in her memoir, Harsh Route (or Steep Route), a case in which she was directly involved during the late 1940s after she had been moved to the prisoners' hospital.

The chief warder shows me the black smoked pot, filled with some food: "I need your medical expertise regarding this meat." I look into the pot, and hardly hold vomiting. The fibres of that meat are very small, and don't resemble me anything I have seen before. The skin on some pieces bristles with black hair ... A former smith from Poltava, Kulesh worked together with Centurashvili. At this time, Centurashvili was only one month away from being discharged from the camp ... And suddenly he surprisingly disappeared ... The wardens searched for two more days, and then assumed that it was an escape case, though they wondered why, since his imprisonment period was almost over ... The crime was there. Approaching the fireplace, Kulesh killed Centurashvili with an axe, burned his clothes, then dismembered him and hid the pieces in snow, in different places, putting specific marks on each burial place. ... Just yesterday, one body part was found under two crossed logs.

== See also ==
- Androphagi, an ancient nation of cannibals
- Cannibalism in Africa
- Cannibalism in Asia
- Cannibalism in Oceania
- Cannibalism in the Americas
- Child cannibalism
- Human fat was used in European pharmacopeia between the 16th and the 19th centuries
- List of incidents of cannibalism
- Mummia, medicine made from human mummies
- R v Dudley and Stephens, an important trial of two men accused of shipwreck cannibalism

== Bibliography ==
- Applebaum, Anne (2017). Red Famine: Stalin's War on Ukraine. London: Penguin.
- Korn, Daniel; Radice, Mark; Hawes, Charlie (2001). Cannibal: The History of the People-Eaters. London: Channel 4 Books.
- Solzhenitsyn, Aleksandr (1973). The Gulag Archipelago.
- White, Tim D. (2006). "Once Were Cannibals". Evolution: A Scientific American Reader. Chicago: University of Chicago Press. pp. 338–346. ISBN 978-0-226-74269-4.
