= Cannibalism in Asia =

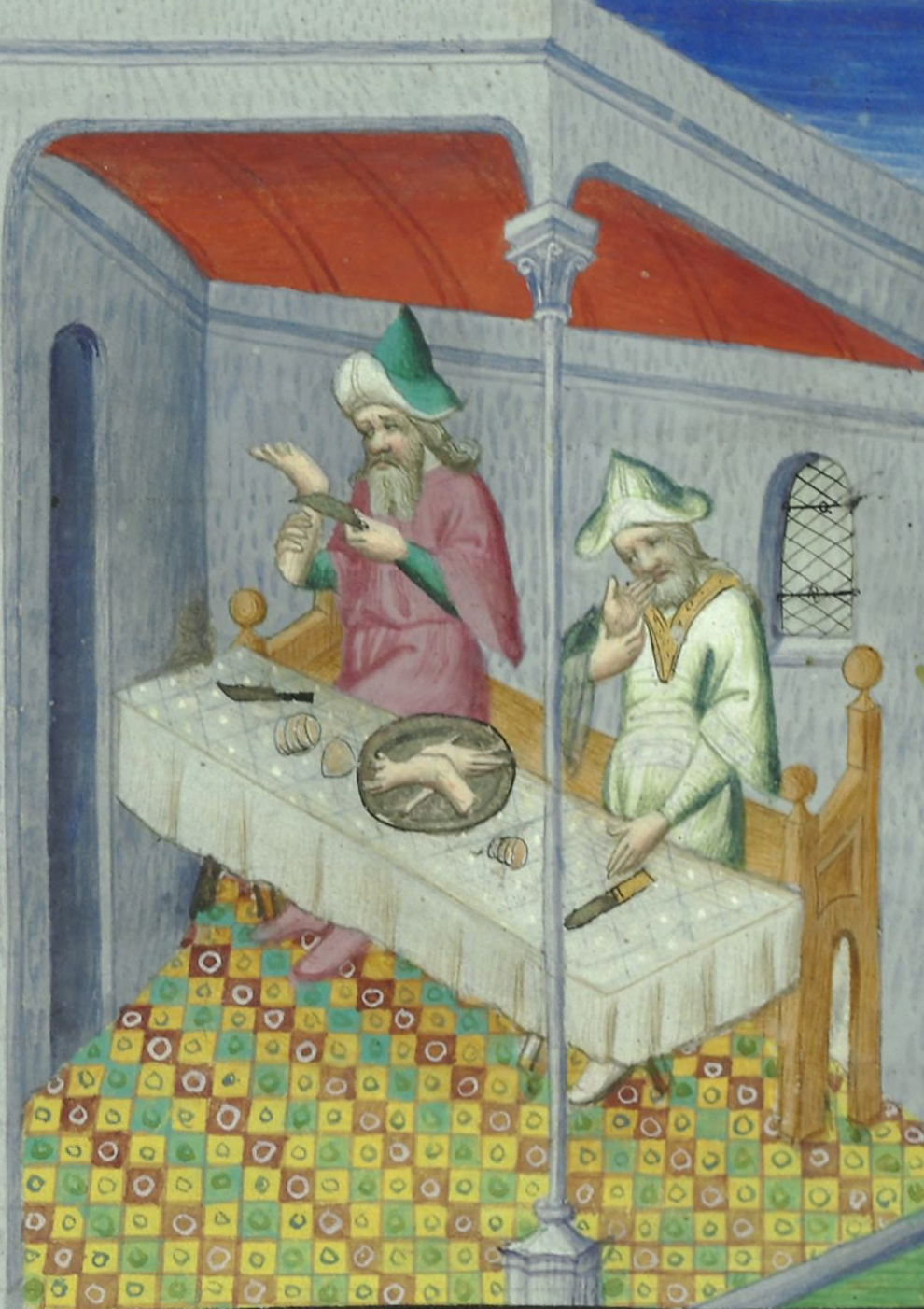
Fanciful depiction of cannibalism in China, from a 15th-century edition of The Travels of Marco Polo

Acts of cannibalism in Asia have been reported from various parts of the continent, ranging from ancient history to the 21st century. Human cannibalism is particularly well documented for China and for islands that today belong to Indonesia.

The history of cannibalism in China is multifaceted, spanning from cases motivated by food scarcity during famines and wars to culturally accepted practices motivated by vengeance, medical beliefs, and even culinary pleasure. Records from China's Twenty-Four Histories document over three hundred episodes of cannibalism, many of them seen as an inevitable means of avoiding starvation. Cannibalism was also employed as a form of vengeance, with individuals and state officials consuming enemies' flesh to further humiliate and punish them. The Histories also document multiple instances of voluntary cannibalism, often involving young individuals offering some of their flesh to ill family members as a form of medical treatment. Various reports, especially from early history and the medieval era, indicate that human flesh could also be served at lavish feasts and was considered an exotic delicacy by some. Generally, the reports from Chinese history suggest that people had fewer reservations about eating human flesh than one might expect today.

Episodes of cannibalism in China continued into the 20th century, especially during the Great Leap Forward (1958–1962) famine. During the Cultural Revolution (1966–1976), multiple cases motivated by hatred rather than hunger seem to have occurred.

In Sumatra, cannibal practices are documented especially for the 14th and the 19th centuries, with purchased children, killed or captured enemies, and executed criminals mentioned as typical victims. In neighbouring Borneo, some Dayak people ate human flesh, especially in the context of headhunting expeditions and war campaigns. In both islands and also in China, human flesh was praised as extraordinarily delicious. Accounts from the 20th and early 21st centuries indicate that the cannibalization of despised enemies could still occur during episodes of mass violence, such as the Indonesian mass killings of 1965–66 and, more recently, the Sampit conflict.

Cases of famine cannibalism have been reported from North Korea during the mid-1990s and subsequent starvation periods, but their prevalence is debated. Various reports indicate that some Japanese soldiers ate human flesh during World War II, motivated by starvation or sometimes by hatred.

== Iran ==
Charges of cannibalism were levied against the Qizilbash of the Safavid Ismail I in the early 16th century.

== India ==
The Aghori are Indian ascetics who believe that eating human flesh confers spiritual and physical benefits, such as the prevention of ageing. They claim only to eat those who have voluntarily granted their body to the sect upon their death, but an Indian TV crew witnessed one Aghori feasting on a corpse discovered floating in the Ganges and a member of the Dom caste reports that Aghori often take bodies from cremation ghats (or funeral pyres). A Dutch photojournalist witnessed the Aghori taking partially burnt bodies from the Manikarnika Ghat cremation grounds and ritualistically consuming the flesh.

== China ==
=== Up to the Yuan dynasty ===
Cannibalism has been repeatedly recorded throughout China's well-documented history. The sinologist Bengt Pettersson found references to more than three hundred different episodes of cannibalism in the Official Dynastic Histories alone. Most episodes occurred in famine or war or were motivated by vengeance or medical reasons. More than half of the episodes recorded in the Official Histories describe cases motivated by food scarcity during famines or in times of war. Pettersson observes that the records of such events "neither encouraged nor condemned" the consumption of human flesh under such circumstances, instead accepting it as an unavoidable way of "coping with a life-threatening situation".

In other cases, cannibalism was an element of vengeance or punishment – eating the hearts and livers, or sometimes the whole bodies, of killed enemies was a way of further humiliating them and sweetening the revenge. Both private individuals and state officials engaged in such acts, especially from the 4th to the 10th century CE but, in some cases, until the end of imperial China in 1912. More than 70 cases are listed in the Official Histories alone. In warfare, human flesh could be eaten out of a lack of other provisions but also out of hatred against the enemy or to celebrate one's victory. Not just enemy fighters, but also their "servants and concubines were all steamed and eaten", according to one account.

At least since the Tang dynasty (618–907), the consumption of human flesh was considered a highly effective medical treatment, recommended by the Bencao Shiyi, an influential medical reference book published in the early 8th century, as well as in similar later manuals. Together with the ethical ideal of filial piety, according to which young people were supposed to do everything in their power to support their parents and parents-in-law, this idea led to a unique form of voluntary cannibalism, in which a young person cut some of the flesh out of their body and gave it to an ill parent or parent-in-law for consumption. The majority of the donors were women, frequently daughters-in-law of the patient.

The devoted daughter-in-law would tie her thigh or her arm very tightly with a piece of clothing. She would then use a very sharp knife to quickly slice off a piece from her upper arm or upper thigh. The flesh would immediately be mixed in with soup or gruel, which had been heated in preparation, and this would then be offered to the dying mother-in-law or father-in-law.

The Official Histories describe more than 110 cases of such voluntary offerings between the early 7th and the early 20th century. While these acts were (at least nominally) voluntary and the donors usually (though not always) survived them, several sources also report of children and adolescents who were killed so that their flesh could be eaten for medical purposes.

During the Tang dynasty, cannibalism was supposedly resorted to by rebel forces early in the period (who were said to raid neighbouring areas for victims to eat), and (on a large scale) by both soldiers and civilians during the siege of Suiyang, a decisive episode of the An Lushan Rebellion. Eating an enemy's heart and liver was also repeatedly mentioned as a feature of both official punishments and private vengeance.

The final decades of the dynasty were marked by large-scale rebellions, during which both rebels and regular soldiers butchered prisoners for food and killed and ate civilians. Sometimes "the rebels captured by government troops were [even] sold as food", according to several Official Histories. At the same time, warlords likewise relied on selling human flesh to finance their rebellions. A Persian merchant visiting China during the turbulent Five Dynasties and Ten Kingdoms period (907–979), which followed the fall of the Tang dynasty, recorded that cannibalism was often inflicted as a punishment and that, after war campaigns, the followers of a defeated warlord were killed and eaten by the victors. He added that human flesh was openly sold in markets, leading him to conclude that cannibalism was "permissible for them according to their legal code".

References to cannibalizing the enemy also appear in poetry written in the subsequent Song dynasty (960–1279) – for example, in Man Jiang Hong – although they are perhaps meant symbolically, expressing hatred towards the enemy. The Official Histories covering this period record various cases of rebels and bandits eating the flesh of their victims. Since this time, the euphemism "two-legged sheep/goat" (兩腳羊 – liǎngjiǎoyáng) was sometimes used to refer to humans who were eaten or intended to be eaten.

The flesh of executed criminals was sometimes cut off and sold for consumption. During the Tang dynasty, a law forbade this practice, but whether the law was effectively enforced is unclear. The sale of human flesh is also repeatedly mentioned during famines in accounts ranging from the 6th to the 15th century. Several of these accounts mention that animal flesh was still available but had become so expensive that few could afford it. Dog meat was five times as expensive as human flesh, according to one such report. Sometimes, poor men sold their wives or children to butchers who slaughtered them and sold their flesh. Cannibalism in famine situations seems to have been generally tolerated by the authorities, who did not intervene when such acts occurred.

Several accounts suggest that human flesh was occasionally eaten for culinary reasons. An anecdote told about Duke Huan of Qi (7th century BCE) claims that he was curious about the taste of "steamed child", having already eaten everything else. His cook supposedly killed his son to prepare the dish, and Duke Huan judged it "the best food of all". In later times, wealthy men, among them a son of the 4th-century emperor Shi Hu and an "open and high-spirited" man who lived in the 7th century CE, served the flesh of purchased women or children during lavish feasts. The sinologist Robert des Rotours observes that while such acts were not common, they do not seem to have been rare exceptions; the hosts did not have to face ostracism or legal prosecution. Key Ray Chong even concludes that "learned cannibalism was often practiced ... for culinary appreciation, and exotic dishes [of human flesh] were prepared for jaded upper-class palates".

The Official Histories mention 10th-century officials who liked to eat the flesh of babies and children, and during the Jin dynasty (1115–1234), human flesh seems to have been readily available at the home of a general, who supposedly served it to one of his guests as a practical joke. Accounts from the 12th to 14th centuries indicate that both soldiers and writers praised this flesh as particularly delicious, considering especially children's flesh as unsurpassable in taste.

Pettersson observes that people generally seem to have had fewer reservations about the consumption of human flesh than one might expect today. While survival cannibalism during famines was regarded as a lamentable necessity, accounts explaining the practice as due to other reasons, such as vengeance or filial piety, were generally even positive.

=== Ming and Qing dynasties ===
Various reports from the early modern period indicate that cannibalism was still practised during famines when other provisions were exhausted. Especially during the chaotic transition from the Ming to the Qing dynasty in the 17th century, severe famines repeatedly led to cannibalism. During a famine in 1622, government troops took the providing of human flesh into their own hands, "openly butcher[ing] and [selling] people in a market where one jin [c. 600 grams] of flesh could be exchanged for one liang [c. 40 grams] of silver." Around 1640, a drought in Henan and Shandong became so bad that "women and babies were arrayed in the market as human food and were sold by the slaughterers just like mutton and pork." Sometimes, women and children were slaughtered in the back rooms of butcher shops while customers were waiting for fresh meat. A few years later in Sichuan, "hundreds of the young and weak" were kidnapped, killed, and eaten; in the markets, men's flesh was sold at a somewhat lower price than that of women, which was considered tastier.

Contemporary reports indicate that in Shaanxi – located between Henan and Sichuan – cannibalism became so common in the early Qing period that the local government "officially sanctioned" the sale and consumption of human flesh. Butchers legally turned towards killing people sold to them and then "sell[ing] their meat"; human-based dishes were also served in restaurants. The History of Ming, one of the Official Dynastic Histories that documented cannibalistic acts, accepted them as inevitable in bad times. "When driven towards dangers, what choices do they have?" it asked rhetorically about a famine in 1611, where people were "selling their daughters and sons, and eating their wives and children".

Centuries later, during the Taiping Rebellion in 1850–1864, "human flesh and organs" – gained by dismembering corpses or by butchering kidnapped persons – "were sold openly at the marketplace", and "some people killed their own children and ate them" to alleviate their hunger. Human hearts became a popular dish, according to some who afterwards freely admitted having purchased and enjoyed them. Zeng Guofan, the general leading the army that suppressed the rebellion, confirmed the open sale of human flesh in his diary – once even complaining about its high price, which had risen again.

Reports of cannibalism and the sale of human flesh during severe famines continued into the early 20th century, up to the final years of Imperial China. Various cases were reported during the Northern Chinese Famine of 1876–1879, with eyewitnesses reporting the sale of human flesh in markets and butcher shops and various (unverified) rumours indicating that it might also have been served in restaurants.

Outside of famines, the flesh of executed criminals was frequently sold for consumption, a traditional custom that lasted until the 19th century.

The indigenous population of Taiwan (then known as Formosa) repeatedly rebelled against Chinese rule. The Chinese army reacted drastically by not only killing suspected rebels but also sometimes eating and selling their flesh. The American journalist James W. Davidson wrote:

One horrible feature of the campaign against the savages was the sale by the Chinese in open market of savage flesh.... After killing a savage, the head was commonly severed from the body and exhibited.... The body was then either divided among its captors and eaten, or sold to wealthy Chinese and even to high officials, who disposed of it in a like manner. The kidney, liver, heart, and soles of the feet were considered the most desirable portions, and were ordinarily cut up into very small pieces, boiled, and eaten somewhat in the form of soup. The flesh and bones were boiled, and the former [latter?] made into a sort of jelly.... During the outbreak of 1891, savage flesh was brought in – in baskets – the same as pork, and sold like pork in the open markets of Tokoham before the eyes of all, foreigners included. Some of the flesh was even sent to Amoy [on the mainland] to be placed on sale there. It was frequently on sale in the small Chinese villages near the border, and often before the very eyes of peaceful groups of savages who happened to be at the place.

Newspaper reports also document the open sale of indigenous flesh. Robert des Rotours has interpreted these acts as due to "contempt for an inferior race", who were seen as so inferior that they could be treated like animals.

=== 20th century to present ===
Severe famine in Henan, Hubei and Anhui during the aftermath of the 1931 Chinese floods led to cannibalism in rural areas, as reported by officials, relief workers and missionaries. In 1936, a severe drought in Sichuan worsened by the ongoing civil war led to a famine killing up to five million people and causing large-scale cannibalism. Human flesh became a traded commodity, with a higher black-market price charged for fresh flesh from a person killed for food compared to flesh from a corpse. Widespread cannibalism again occurred in Henan in the Chinese famine of 1942–1943, during the Japanese invasion of China, as ecological disasters combined with war pressures led to mass starvation.

Cannibalism is also documented to have occurred in rural China during the severe famine that resulted from the Great Leap Forward (1958–1962). During Mao Zedong's Cultural Revolution (1966–1976), local governments' documents revealed hundreds of incidents of cannibalism for ideological reasons, including large-scale cannibalism during the Guangxi Massacre. Cannibal acts occurred at public events organized by local Communist Party officials, with people taking part in them to prove their revolutionary passion. The writer Zheng Yi documented many of these incidents, especially those in Guangxi, in his 1993 book, Scarlet Memorial.

Pills made of human flesh were said to be used by some Tibetan Buddhists, motivated by a belief that mystical powers were bestowed upon those who consumed Brahmin flesh.

== Sumatra and Borneo ==
=== Medieval era ===
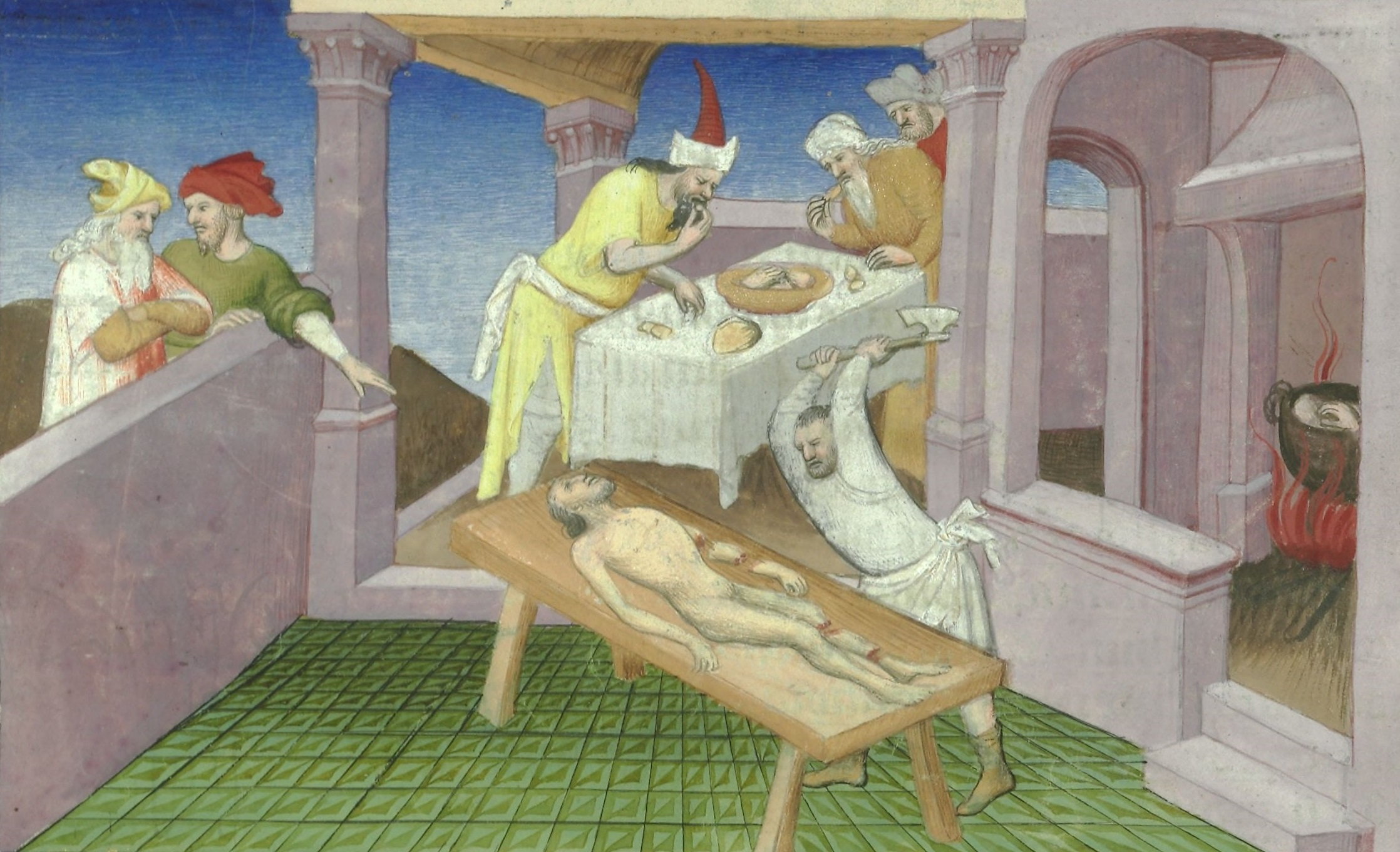
Illustration from an early edition of Odoric of Pordenone's travel report, depicting cannibalism not in Sumatra, but in another island, possibly one of the Andaman Islands

According to the 14th-century traveller Odoric of Pordenone, the inhabitants of Lamuri, a kingdom in northern Sumatra, purchased children from foreign merchants to "slaughter them in the shambles and eat them". Odoric states that the kingdom was wealthy. There was no lack of other food, suggesting that the custom was driven by a preference for human flesh rather than by hunger. He shows excellent knowledge of Sumatra, indicating that he had been there. Several other sources confirm that cannibalism was practised in northern Sumatra around that time. The merchants, though likely not cannibals themselves, apparently had no scruples selling slave children for the "shambles". Odoric's account was later borrowed by John Mandeville for his Book of Marvels and Travels.

=== Early modern and colonial period ===
When the German-Dutch botanist and geologist Franz Wilhelm Junghuhn visited Sumatra in the 1840s, a Batak raja served him a soup containing the flesh of freshly slaughtered captives. The host was surprised to learn that Europeans did not like to eat human flesh, which in Sumatra was widely praised as particularly tasty. At that time, captured enemies and convicted criminals were generally eaten, and some wealthy men bought enslaved people for fattening and consumption. An anecdote suggests that the washing of a child was associated with the preparation for a cannibal meal, prior to the child being roasted.

There are various reports of Dayak people in neighbouring Borneo eating human flesh, especially in the context of headhunting expeditions. James Brooke, who founded the Raj of Sarawak in northwestern Borneo, collected eyewitness accounts of the consumption of killed enemies after war campaigns. He also heard (though not from eyewitnesses) that in some areas a "fat child" was traditionally served at Makantaun, an annual festival held at the end of the harvest season.

The Norwegian explorer Carl Bock, who visited Borneo in the late 1870s, met a Dayak chief named Sibau Mobang who told him that "his people did not eat human meat every day", but rather in the context of "head-hunting expeditions". Mobang had just returned from such an expedition, in which "no less than seventy victims, men, women and children" had been killed and partially eaten. Bock also met a local priestess who said that human "palms [were] considered the best eating", together with "the brains, and the flesh on the knees" – these parts were always eaten, even if the rest of the body was not. The naturalist Albert S. Bickmore, who travelled through Borneo in the 1860s, agreed that some Dayak groups practised cannibalism. Both captured enemies and those found guilty of a crime (such as theft) were killed and eaten out of revenge and due to an "appetite" for human flesh, which was considered uniquely tasty.

=== 20th century to present ===
In Joshua Oppenheimer's film The Look of Silence, several of the anti-Communist militias active in the Indonesian mass killings of 1965–66 claim that drinking blood from their victims prevented them from going mad.

During the Sambas riots, a massacre of the Madurese minority in the Indonesian part of Borneo in 1999, "hundreds of Madurese [were] decapitated and eaten", according to reporter Richard Lloyd Parry. Travelling through the region at that time, Parry saw seven severed heads and various other body parts as well as "numerous pieces of heart and liver, and a dismembered torso being cooked over a fire by the side of the road". He met a Dayak teenager who told he had helped to kill and eat four Madurese people "because we hate the Madurese ... Mostly we shoot them first, and then we chop the body. It tastes just like chicken." A Dayak teacher explained that "when people do not respect our [traditions], they become enemies, and we don't consider our enemies to be human any more. They become animals in our eyes. And the Dayaks eat animals."

While the teenager told him "We don't kill babies", but only those "around 13 or 15" or older, Parry also met a village chief who had "seen six or seven children with their heads cut off" and stated, "They kill everyone, including babies. They chop their heads off and they eat them." When visiting a town market, Parry saw "a charred femur ... among the embers of a fire" and met a Dayak man who held "a lump of what he said was human meat" and then started to eat it. Unsure how to react, Parry asked about the taste, and the man replied: "Delicious". Parry remarked that, after the first shock had passed, "the most devastating thing about cannibalism and headhunting is not the fear and the blood, but the terrible, profound banality."

Two years later, during the Sampit conflict, Dayaks went again "on a rampage of killing and decapitation with the aim of driving the Madurese from the province." According to their own reports, they "killed 2,000 Madurese, in many cases cutting off their heads as trophies, drinking their blood and cutting out their hearts and eating them on the spot." A Dayak spokesperson said that, because of their anger and resentment against the Madurese settlers, "They don't recognize whether they are women or children. They just see them as animals that have to be destroyed." A Madurese survivor mourned his murdered children and grandchildren: "They cut off their heads and then cut them up and took them away to eat." Police and army, though called to the scene, seem to have done little to stop the violence until at least 500 people were dead.

== North Korea ==
Reports of widespread cannibalism began to emerge from North Korea during a severe famine in the mid-1990s and subsequent starvation episodes. Though Kim Jong Il reportedly ordered a crackdown on cannibalism in 1996, Chinese travellers reported several cases in 1998. In the same year, several North Korean refugees told of people eating children (their own or orphans) in their neighbourhood.

According to defectors, there were several cases of cannibalism between 2006 and 2011, and at least three people were executed for their involvement in such acts. One man had supposedly killed and eaten a girl, while another was arrested for murdering a co-worker and selling his flesh as mutton. Further reports of cannibalism emerged in early 2013, including reports of a man executed for killing his two children for food.

There are conflicting claims about how widespread cannibalism was in North Korea during the mid-1990s. On the one hand, statements by refugees suggest that it was widespread and sometimes claimed a lot of victims. One man told the journalist Jasper Becker that in May 1997 a couple had been "executed for murdering 50 children" and selling their flesh, "mixed with pork", in the market. On the other hand, Barbara Demick concluded in her book, Nothing to Envy: Ordinary Lives in North Korea (2010), that – though there were actual cases – the practice does not seem to have been as widespread as some people feared, with rumours exaggerating what occurred.

== Japanese soldiers during World War II ==
The Australian War Crimes Section of the Tokyo tribunal, led by prosecutor William Webb (the future Judge-in-Chief), collected numerous written reports and testimonies that documented acts of cannibalism by Japanese soldiers among their own troops, on enemy dead, as well as on Allied prisoners of war (POWs) in many parts of the so-called Greater East Asia Co-Prosperity Sphere. In September 1942, Japanese daily rations on New Guinea consisted of 800 grams of rice and tinned meat. However, by December, this had fallen to 50 grams. According to historian Yuki Tanaka, "cannibalism was often a systematic activity conducted by whole squads and under the command of officers".

In some cases, flesh was cut from living people. A prisoner of war from the British Indian Army, Lance Naik Hatam Ali, testified that in New Guinea

the Japanese started selecting prisoners and every day one prisoner was taken out and killed and eaten by the soldiers. I personally saw this happen and about 100 prisoners were eaten at this place by the Japanese. The remainder of us were taken to another spot 50 miles [80 km] away where 10 prisoners died of sickness. At this place, the Japanese again started selecting prisoners to eat. Those selected were taken to a hut where their flesh was cut from their bodies while they were alive, and they were thrown into a ditch where they later died.

Another well-documented case occurred in Chichijima in late 1944, when Japanese soldiers killed eight American airmen, consuming several of them. This case was investigated in 1947 in a war crimes trial. Of 30 Japanese soldiers prosecuted, five (Maj. Matoba, Gen. Tachibana, Adm. Mori, Capt. Yoshii, and Dr. Teraki) were found guilty and hanged. In his book Flyboys: A True Story of Courage, James Bradley details several instances of cannibalism of World War II Allied prisoners by their Japanese captors. The author claims that this included not only ritual cannibalization of the livers of freshly killed prisoners, but also the cannibalization-for-sustenance of living prisoners over several days, amputating limbs only as needed to keep the meat fresh.

There are more than 100 documented cases in Australia's government archives of Japanese soldiers practising cannibalism on enemy soldiers and civilians in New Guinea during the war. For instance, an Australian lieutenant describes how he discovered a scene with cannibalized bodies, including one "consisting only of a head which had been scalped and a spinal column". He added that "in all cases, the condition of the remains were such that there can be no doubt that the bodies had been dismembered and portions of the flesh cooked".

There was also an archived memo, in which a Japanese general stated that eating anyone except enemy soldiers was punishable by death. Tanaka states that cannibalism was often practised "to consolidate the group feeling of the troops" rather than due to food shortage and that it served as a power projection tool – a reassurance and signal of one's own strength and superiority over those one could reduce to food.

Jemadar Abdul Latif (VCO of the 4/9 Jat Regiment of the British Indian Army and POW rescued by the Australians at Sepik Bay in 1945) stated that the Japanese soldiers ate both Indian POWs and local New Guinean people. At the camp for Indian POWs in Wewak, where many died and 19 POWs were eaten, the Japanese doctor and lieutenant Tumisa would send an Indian out of the camp, where he would be killed by a group of Japanese. Certain body parts (such as the liver, buttocks, thighs, legs, and arms) were then cooked and eaten, according to Captain R. U. Pirzai.

In early 1945, Japanese soldiers gave Korean forced labourers on Mili Atoll, Marshall Islands, "whale meat" to consume, which was actually human flesh from other dead Koreans. Upon realizing what had occurred, the enraged Koreans staged a rebellion that was eventually put down, which resulted in around 55 deaths.

On the other hand, Japanese soldiers occupying Jolo Island in the Philippines were themselves at risk. One of them, Fujioka Akiyoshi, stated that local Moro resistance fighters killed a thousand soldiers during the first month of the Japanese occupation, afterwards routinely removing their gold teeth for melting and their livers for consumption. While the Moro cannibalism seems to have been largely symbolic and limited to the livers, another Japanese soldier, Yano Masami, recorded in his diary that, to escape starvation, he had eaten the flesh of a sergeant in his group who had committed suicide. Fujioka was happy when he could finally surrender to the Americans, knowing that this meant his escape from the double risk of dying of starvation or being killed by local fighters.

== See also ==
- Cannibalism in Africa
- Cannibalism in Europe
- Cannibalism in Oceania
- Cannibalism in the Americas
- Chijon family, a Korean gang that killed and ate rich people
- Child cannibalism
- Issei Sagawa, a Japanese man who murdered and partially ate a Dutch student
- List of incidents of cannibalism
- Traditional Chinese medicines derived from the human body

== Bibliography ==
- Chong, Key Ray (1990). Cannibalism in China. Wakefield, NH: Longwood.
- Edgerton-Tarpley, Kathryn (2008). Tears from Iron: Cultural Responses to Famine in Nineteenth-Century China. Berkeley: University of California Press. ISBN 978-0-520-25302-5.
- Pettersson, Bengt (1999). "Cannibalism in the Dynastic Histories". Bulletin of the Museum of Far Eastern Antiquities. 71: 73–189.
- Siefkes, Christian (2022). Edible People: The Historical Consumption of Slaves and Foreigners and the Cannibalistic Trade in Human Flesh. New York: Berghahn. ISBN 978-1-80073-613-9.
- Yoshimi, Yoshiaki (2015). Grassroots Fascism: The War Experience of the Japanese People. Weatherhead Books on Asia. Translated by Ethan Mark. Columbia University Press. ISBN 978-0-231-16568-6.
- Zheng, Yi (2018). Scarlet Memorial: Tales of Cannibalism in Modern China. Taylor & Francis. ISBN 978-0-429-97277-5.
