= Cannibalism in Africa =

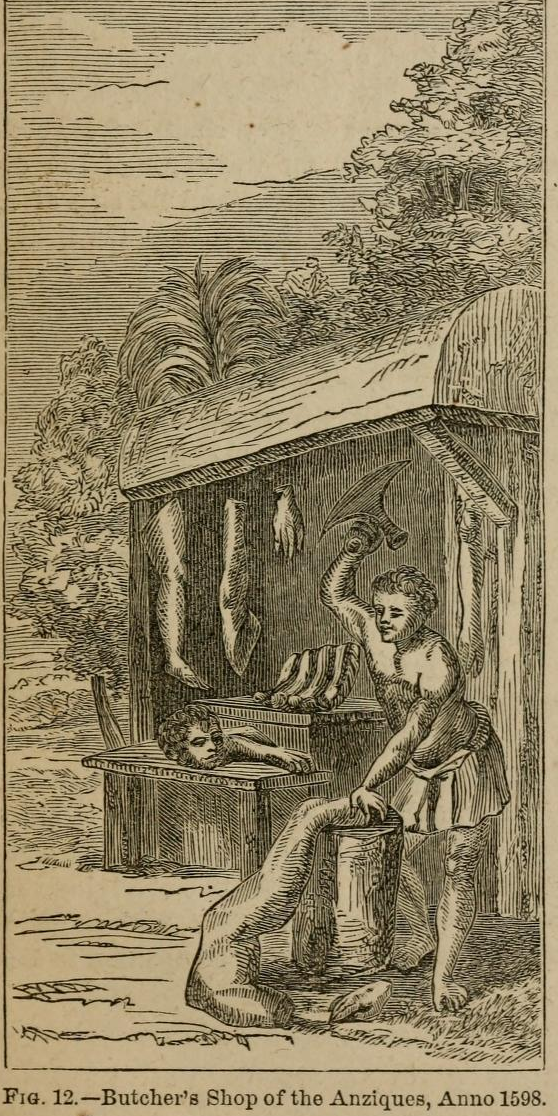
Sale of human flesh in the late 16th century. Engraving by Theodor de Bry illustrating Filippo Pigafetta's Report of the Kingdom of Congo, which contains the oldest known account of cannibalism in Central Africa.

Acts of cannibalism in Africa have been reported from various parts of the continent, ranging from prehistory until the 21st century. The oldest firm evidence of archaic humans consuming each other dates to 1.45 million years ago in Kenya. Archaeological evidence for human cannibalism exists later among anatomically modern humans, but its frequency remains unknown. Later in East Africa, the Ugandan dictator Idi Amin was reputed to practise cannibalism, and acts of voluntary and forced cannibalism have been reported from the South Sudanese Civil War. While the oldest known written mention of cannibalism is from the tomb of the Egyptian king Unas, later evidence from Egypt shows it to only re-appear during occasional episodes of severe famine.

Reports describing cannibal practices were most often recorded by outsiders and were especially during the colonial epoch commonly used to justify the subjugation and exploitation of non-European peoples in Africa and elsewhere, therefore such sources need to be particularly critically examined before being accepted. There is nevertheless good evidence of cannibal customs once existing in certain contexts in some African regions as well as in other parts of the world (including Europe). The idea of a universal taboo against cannibalism, implicitly or explicitly used by some authors to reject any such evidence, has been criticized as ethnocentric by others since it takes a notion from the modern Western world and declares it to be universal.

The oldest records of cannibalism in West Africa are from Muslim authors who visited the region in the 14th century. Later accounts often ascribe it to secret societies such as the Leopard Society. Cannibal practices were also reported among various Nigerian peoples. The victims were usually killed or captured enemies, kidnapped strangers, and purchased slaves. Cannibalism was practised to express hatred and to humiliate one's enemies, as well as to avoid waste and because meat in general was rare; human flesh was also considered tastier than that of animals. While its consumption during peacetime seems to have ceased, cannibal acts are on record for civil wars in Liberia and Sierra Leone around the turn from the 20th to the 21st century.

In the late 19th century, cannibalism seems to have been especially prevalent in parts of the Congo Basin. While some groups rejected the custom, others indulged in human flesh, often considering it superior to other meats. Killed or captured enemies could be consumed, and individuals from different ethnic groups were sometimes hunted down for the same purpose. Enslaved people were also sacrificed for the table, especially young children, who were otherwise in little demand but praised as particularly delicious. In some areas, human flesh and slaves intended for eating were sold at marketplaces. While cannibalism became rarer under the colonial Congo Free State and its Belgium-run successor, colonial authorities seem to have done little to suppress the practice. Human flesh still appeared on the tables up to the 1950s and was eaten and sold during the Congo Crisis in the 1960s. Occasional reports of cannibalism during violent conflicts continue into the 21st century.

Cannibalism was also reported from north of the Congo Basin, extending up to the Central African Republic Civil War, which started in 2012. Jean-Bédel Bokassa, dictator of the Central African Republic, seems to have eaten the flesh of opponents and prisoners in the 1970s. In the 19th century, cannibalism was also practised in the Southern African Zulu Kingdom and adjacent areas during times of famine and social disruption, particularly during a violent period that became known as Mfecane.

== Tropes and discourses ==
Cameroonian anthropologist Francis B. Nyamnjoh notes that accusations of cannibalism, whether justified or not, were often used to "other" non-Western peoples, thus serving to justify their colonization and exploitation. Claims of cannibalism were sometimes also used to justify slavery, since it was argued that enslavement was a better fate than the risk of being killed and consumed at home.

Criticizing the often "morbid fascination" of Westerners with cannibalism in a narrow sense – "making a meal of the flesh and bones of others" – as "parochial" and prone to lead to othering, Nyamnjoh pleads for a wider concept of cannibalism or cannibalization that is not limited to the eating of human flesh, but includes other ways of benefiting from other people's bodies and lives, including "enslavement and extractive colonialism in the past" as well as "extractive capitalism" and human trafficking today. He notes that, with such a wider understanding, cannibalism and cannibalization are "ubiquit[ous]" and indeed "the only game in town", instead of just a custom of "purportedly inferior others".

Nyamnjoh notes that cannibalism in a narrow sense was and is often regarded as "an evil act ... associated with primitive savages living dangerously like wild animals at the margins of humanity and human civilisation, and needing to be stamped out at all costs", with even those advocating cultural relativism usually becoming "uneas[y] when it comes to making a case for tolerance and accommodation of cannibalism". Some authors, who find it difficult to accept cannibalism as one of many possible human behaviours, but do not want to appear narrow-minded by openly condemning it, have responded with a "blanket disbelief in ritual [= not just exceptional] cannibalism". This stance superficially acknowledges cultural relativism, but avoids confronting the complex realities of diverse human experiences in other societies, the sometimes challenging "other ways of being human" that may including consuming the flesh of others. Nyamnjoh suggests that instead of making implausible arguments against the mere existence of cannibalism, it is more productive to accept it and view it in context. This perspective includes recognizing that there are other exploitative practices that, while not involving the physical consumption of others, are still deeply harmful to them.

Nyamnjoh warns that one must be careful when considering historical accounts attributing cannibalism to others, since "claims and accusations of cannibalism served as the perfect excuse for enslavement, colonisation, exploitation and forceful Christianisation and Westernisation". Whether factual, exaggerated, or imagined, such statements were used to justify "the colonising, enslaving and dispossessing ... of non-Western 'Others'" – hence, ironically, charges of cannibalism served to justify the subsequent "cannibalisation" of the accused by Western colonialists.

For example, from reports that human flesh was eaten and sold in some African regions, Georg Wilhelm Friedrich Hegel concluded that Africans in general had not "progressed even to a limited extent" and were "incapable of making a distinction between human flesh and ram flesh". He described Black Africans in general as so "sensuous" that they treated "human flesh [a]s purely an object of the senses, like all other flesh". For him, the "eating of human flesh is quite compatible with the African principle", while Europeans "instinctively reject it" as "utterly barbarous and revolting". In his racist stereotyping, he thus saw a general "African principle" or character that included cannibalism as one of its fundamental traits, while Europeans generally rejected it due to their higher "consciousness". He went on to claim that "slavery is 'natural' to Africans" because "human beings are valued so cheaply" among them and because their "moral sentiments are ... altogether deficient", in this way justifying their enslavement and exploitation.

While stating that scepticism and a thorough examination of historical accounts and archaeological evidence are therefore indeed called for, Nyamnjoh warns against throwing out the "baby" of credible evidence with the "bathwater" of exaggerated or merely rumoured "cannibal talk". He states that some authors seem "overly defensive" in their unwillingness to accept even well-substantiated accounts of cannibal customs. He suspects that, "even among ... non-Western critics", this is due to "a rather limited Eurocentric idea of consumption and of what it means to be human". If one unconsciously accepts the old European prejudice that anyone who eats human flesh is "less than human", then the only way of defending those "accused" of such practices is to claim that they did not do it. But if one rejects such a "skewed Eurocentric understanding", it becomes easier to accept that cannibalism is "part and parcel of being and becoming human" and that it made sense for those who practised it.

Nyamnjoh also describes it as illogical that sceptics readily accept "state violence, bloody wars of genocidal proportions and violent encounters, slavery, colonialism and myriad forms of rabid imperialism" as part of the historical record, while rejecting the idea of cannibal practices that may well "have gone with or resulted from such conflicts". Other authors likewise observe a "strong ethnocentrism" in the idea that cannibalism could never have been a socially accepted custom, in that a taboo of our own society is silently (or explicitly) declared to be universal. Kajsa Ekholm Friedman notes that such an utter rejection of cannibalism as human possibility makes sense only if one implicitly considers it "the worst thing of all" – worse than any other behaviour people engaged in, and therefore uniquely suited to vilifying others. She calls this "a remarkable opinion in a culture [the European/American one] that has been capable of the most extreme cruelty and destructive behavior, both at home and in other parts of the world."

Nyamnjoh and others also note that Europeans were quite hypocritical when condemning the cannibalism of others, while at the same or almost the same time practising their own forms of cannibalism – especially medicinal cannibalism – at home. Other authors state that when Europeans associated cannibalism only with (often darker-skinned) others, they ignored the "long history of cannibalism" of their own continent, well attested by archaeological and historical evidence.

Even when practised within Africa, cannibalism was not necessarily a purely local phenomenon. In the Congo Basin, it became more widespread and common due to the Atlantic and Indian Ocean slave trade, the international ivory trade (since ivory was not rarely paid for with slaves who were then eaten), and the violent and exploitative regime of the colonial Congo Free State, which sometimes tolerated cannibal acts among its own local troops and allies.

== North Africa ==
=== Early history ===
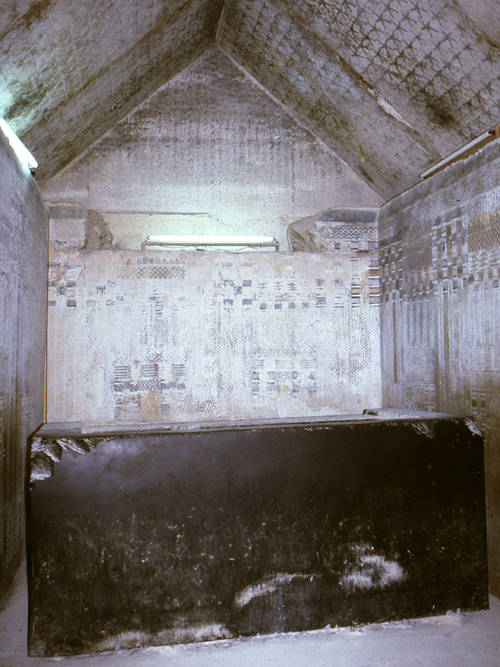
Sarcophagus and funerary chamber in the Pyramid of Unas, where the Cannibal Hymn was found

Cannibalism was occasionally practised in Egypt during ancient and Roman times, as well as later during severe famines. The oldest written reference to cannibalism known from anywhere in the world may be from the tomb of the ancient Egyptian king Unas (24th century BCE). It contained a hymn in praise of the king portraying him as a cannibal who eats both "men" and "gods", thus indicating an attitude towards cannibalism quite different from the modern one.

Cassius Dio recorded cannibalism practised by the bucoli, Egyptian tribes led by Isidorus against Rome. They sacrificed and consumed two Roman officers ritualistically, swearing an oath over their entrails.

=== 13th century ===
In the early 13th century, the Arab physician Abd al-Latif al-Baghdadi lived in Cairo when a severe famine, caused by the Nile failing to overflow its banks, devastated the country. According to his detailed description, in 1200 CE, the food situation became so dire that many people turned to cannibalism. He repeatedly saw "little children, roasted or boiled" whole, offered for sale in baskets on street corners. Once, he even saw "a child nearing the age of puberty, who had been found roasted"; two young people confessed to having killed and cooked the child. In some cases, children were roasted and offered for sale by their parents; other victims were street children, who had become very numerous and were often kidnapped and cooked by people looking for food or extra income. Abd al-Latif states that "the guilty were rarely caught in the act, and only when they were careless." The victims were so numerous that sometimes "two or three children, even more, would be found in a single cooking pot."

Abd al-Latif notes that, while initially, people were shocked by such acts, they

eventually ... grew accustomed, and some conceived such a taste for these detestable meats that they made them their ordinary provender, eating them for enjoyment and ... [thinking] up a variety of preparation methods ... The horror people had felt at first vanished entirely; one spoke of it, and heard it spoken of, as a matter of everyday indifference.

To cater to the tastes of the rich, cooks started to combine human flesh with exquisite ingredients, such as in Alexandria, where a friend of Abd al-Latif once saw "five children's heads in a single cauldron, cooked with the choicest spices." This "remarkable" meal was just one "of a great many events of this kind" his friend had encountered in that city.

== West Africa ==
=== 14th century ===
When the Moroccan explorer Ibn Battuta visited the Mali Empire in the 1350s, he was surprised to see sultan Sulayman give "a slave girl as part of his reception-gift" to a group of warriors from a cannibal region who had come to visit his court. "They slaughtered her and ate her and smeared their faces and hands with her blood and came in gratitude to the sultan." He was told that the sultan did so every time he received the cannibal guests. Though a Muslim like Ibn Battuta himself, he considered catering to his visitors' preferences more important than whatever reservations he may have had about the practice. Other Muslim authors writing around that time also reported that cannibalism was practised in some West African regions and that slave girls were sometimes slaughtered for food since "their flesh is the best thing we have to eat."

=== 16th and 17th centuries ===
According to stories circulating in the local population at that time, the Mane people who invaded and partially ruled Sierra Leone in the 16th and early 17th centuries practised cannibalism, slaughtering and cooking captive woman and spit-roasting whole babies, "stuffed with rice". The reliability of these tales is unclear, but they were often very specific, indicating they may have been more than mere rumours.

=== 19th century ===
Cannibal customs were recorded among the Igbo and some other Nigerian peoples by both colonial explorers and natives. Various people have memories of their ancestors eating human flesh a few generations earlier. Up to the 1870s at least – and in some cases until the 1900s – killed or captured members of enemy groups were consumed after successful war campaigns, sometimes in large numbers. The flesh of enemies was eaten not only to celebrate one's victory but also for reasons of efficiency. Since "feeding in the battle field was difficult", warriors were not inclined to waste edible matter. But there are also accounts indicating that captives were divided among the victors, who took them home to kill and eat them. In 1895, a German missionary witnessed how Nembe warriors slaughtered more than 40 captives – foreigners working for the Royal Niger Company – in a village near Akassa:

Every moment, men, women and even children passed me. One would be carrying a human leg on his shoulder, another would be carrying the lungs or the heart of some unfortunate Kroo-boy in his or her hands. Several times I myself was offered my choice of one of these morsels, dripping with gore.

A repeatedly expressed motive for consuming one's enemies was hatred: by reducing them to edible matter that was then digested, one annihilated them, physically and symbolically, thus achieving the "ultimate revenge". In some regions, people also believed that a person's spirit would usually survive their physical body but that the spirit had to die too if the body was destroyed, so cannibalism was employed to achieve the total destruction that killing alone could not achieve.

Enemies were not the only victims, however. Several reports indicate that kidnapped strangers or purchased slaves could be eaten too. In some areas, any lonely stranger was at risk of being kidnapped and either enslaved or else – especially if they were considered less valuable to sell – killed and consumed. Oral accounts indicate that at the start of the 20th century, though the open slave trade was by then a thing of the past, "people were still being kidnapped and either killed and eaten or sold away or sacrificed to one god or the other." The victims were often playing children or lonely travellers. In earlier times, when slavery was still an accepted institution, young children purchased from other regions were sometimes deliberately fattened, "kept in pens" much like animals, before being "killed and baked".

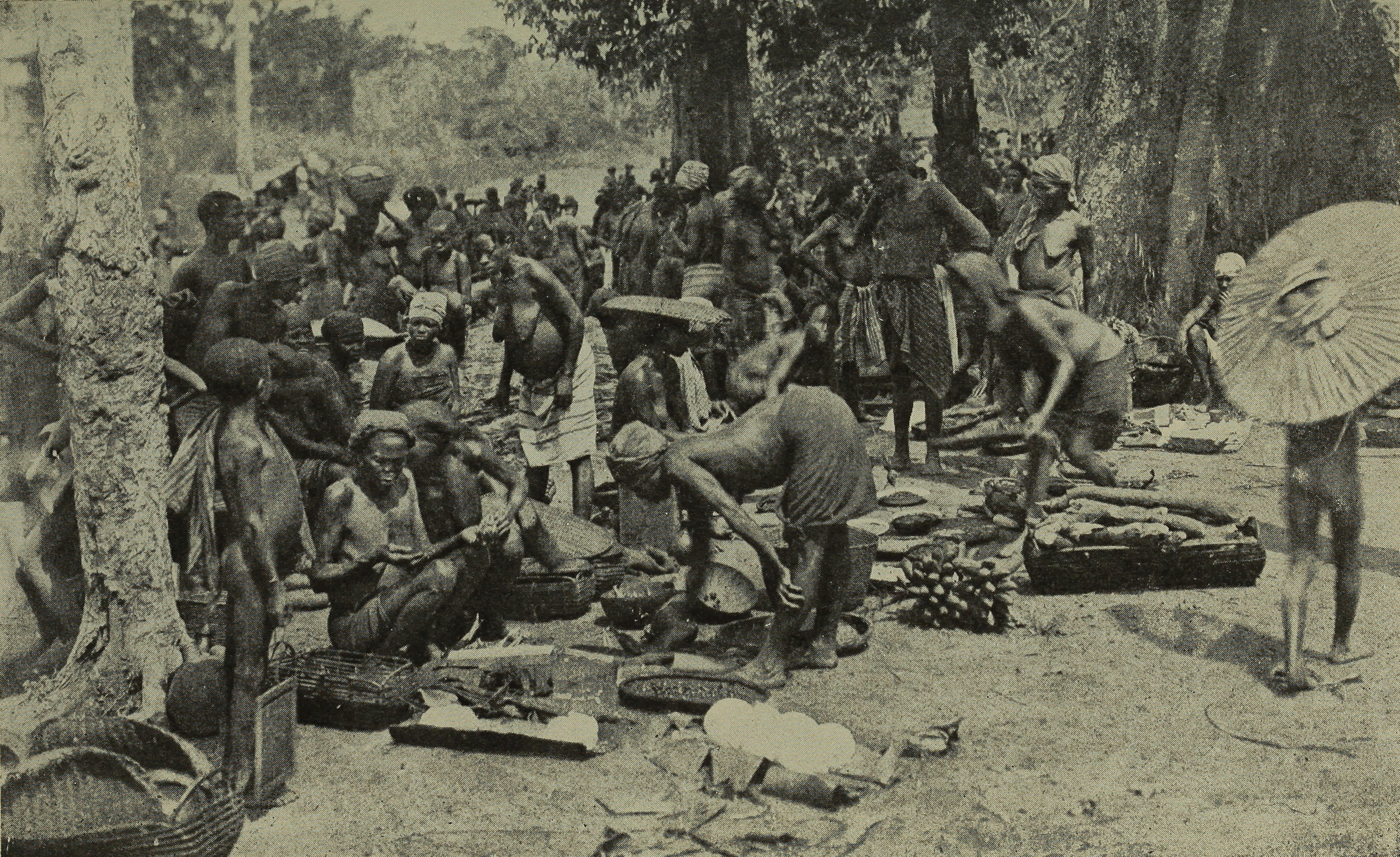
An Igbo market, photographed by George Basden in the early 20th century

Missionaries and travellers report that human flesh was offered for sale at markets "in many parts of Nigeria". According to clergyman and archdeacon George Basden, who spent more than 30 years in the country, in some southern regions, it had a well-established market price and was sold much like any other commodity; it usually came from war captives, kidnapped strangers, and purchased or bartered slaves. While travelling near Onitsha around the year 1900, Basden found out that his servants and carriers had all repeatedly eaten human flesh. Once they were sure that he bore them no ill will, they talked freely about the custom, including their preferred body parts. He noted that they were "quite good-natured folk", with one of them later becoming "a much-respected evangelist".

The consumption of kidnapped strangers or purchased slaves could hardly be due to hatred, and indeed the British anthropologist Charles Kingsley Meek found that the most frequent rationale he heard from cannibals or former cannibals in northern Nigeria was that human flesh was eaten "purely as meat". People did not want to waste an opportunity to eat good meat when they saw one, and the lives of enemies or outsiders were of no concern to them. His colleague Percy Amaury Talbot observed the same among the Igbo and some other inhabitants of southern Nigeria: human flesh was eaten because of a "great longing for meat". Most people considered meat a rare luxury and saw no reason to be squeamish about how they got it as long as it did not come from relatives or friends. Moreover, human flesh was preferred over that of animals for gastronomic reasons: it was considered the tastiest of all meats because of its "succulence" and sweetness (followed by monkey meat as second best). Young children were most appreciated, since "the younger the person, the tenderer are the 'joints'".

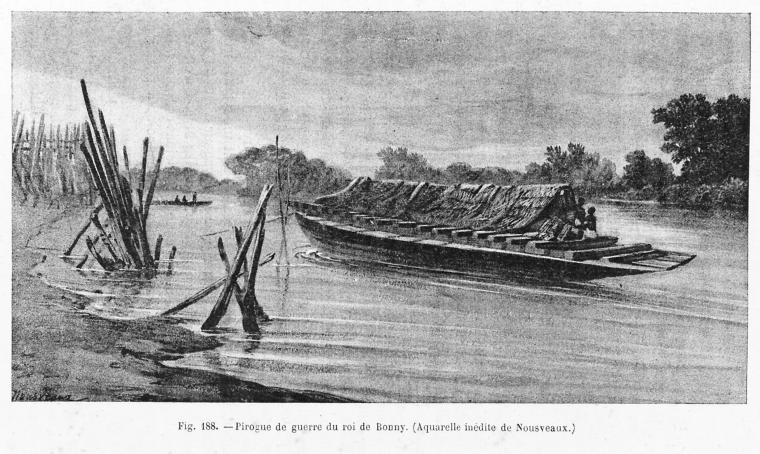
Royal canoe of the Kingdom of Bonny, 1890

King George Oruigbiji Pepple of the Kingdom of Bonny (ruled 1866–1883) embarrassed his British allies by "celebrat[ing] the anniversary of his father's death with a cannibal feast". When the British reproached him, he replied that he had merely upheld a time-honoured "custom of his country", also practised by his forefathers.

=== 20th century to present ===
==== Cameroon before World War I ====
Among the Maka people in southeastern Cameroon, eating strangers was once "quite normal", as the Dutch anthropologist Peter Geschiere learned from various old informants who remembered this custom from their youth. Eating one's own kin, however, was strictly taboo and considered a "very evil" act only committed by witches.

In 1910, a young German rubber merchant was killed together with his cook, his concubine, and two porters, after they had wandered too far off the main road. "According to oral tradition and numerous witnesses ..., their bodies were cut into pieces and eaten" – the usual treatment of any non-kin enemy. The German colonial government reacted with a large-scale punitive expedition, in which various Maka villages were burned and all their inhabitants, including women and children, were arrested.

==== Secret societies ====
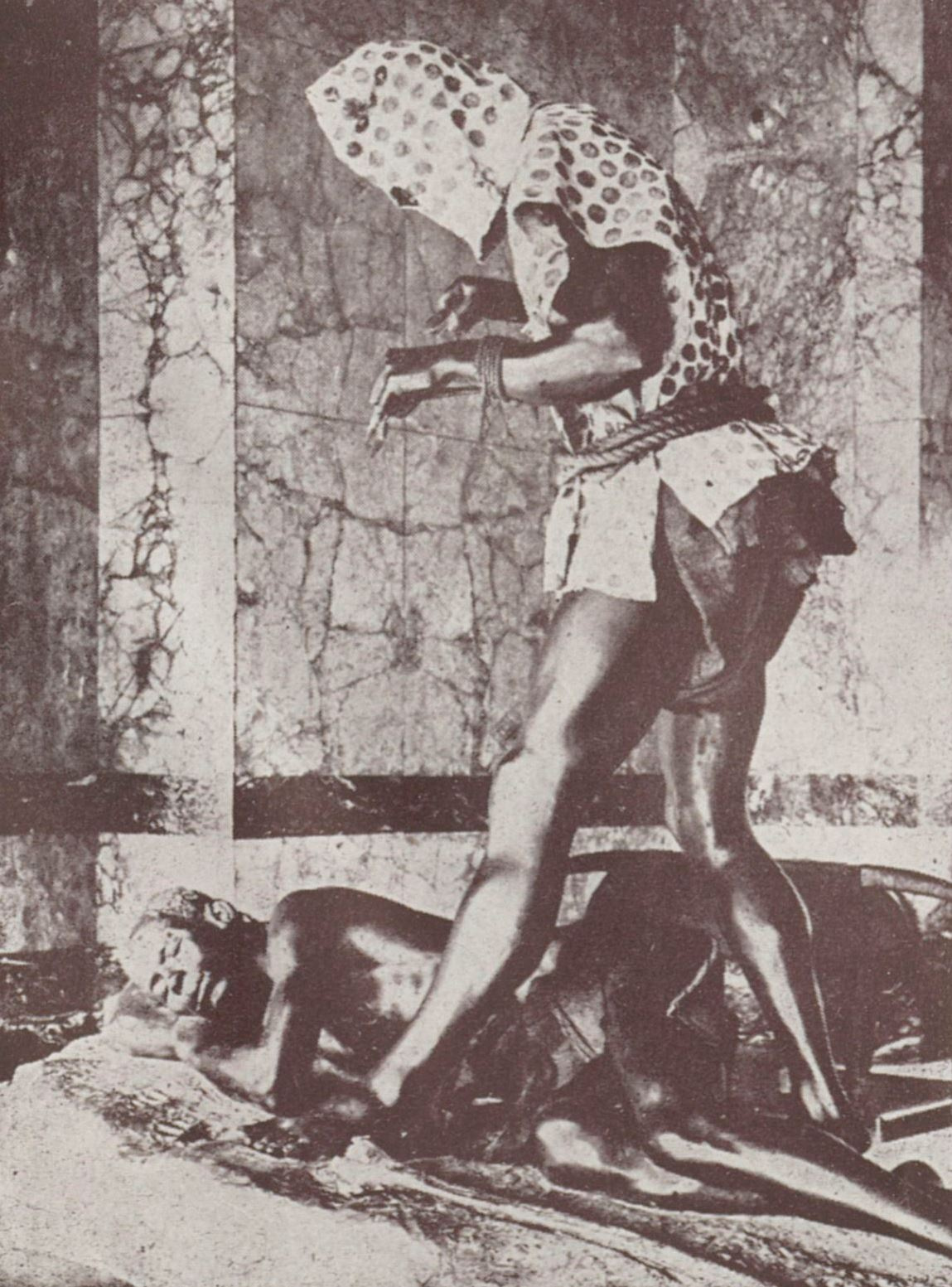
A sculpture by Paul Wissaert depicting a leopard man, 1913

The Leopard Society was a cannibalistic secret society that existed until the mid-1900s and was primarily active in regions that today belong to Sierra Leone, Liberia and Ivory Coast. The Leopard men would dress in leopard skins and supposedly waylay travellers with sharp claw-like weapons in the form of leopards' claws and teeth. The victims' flesh would be cut from their bodies and distributed to members of the society.

During field research in the 1960s among the Mano people in north-central Liberia, the American anthropologist James Riddell collected detailed statements about the Leopard and Crocodile Societies that had been active in that area, including from former members of these societies. They had comprised men from different towns and their primary purpose had been to organize trade between these towns, which were otherwise independent political units. Only men who could command the labour of many dependents were allowed to join, as the trade organization and the transport and protection of trade goods were labour-intensive. Those who wanted to join had to sacrifice a member of their "own domestic group in a cannibalistic feast" to prove that they had sufficiently many dependents whose services they could contribute – the supposed waylaying of travellers was only a trick to hide the connection between the victim and the man who had chosen to sacrifice them. While earlier observers did not know the specific context of these rites, some of them were aware that the victims were often younger relatives of the perpetrators, with teenage girls or (less often) boys being frequent victims.

In a criminal trial in the 1900s, a member of the Leopard Society confessed that he had been present when a girl donated by another member of the society had been murdered and that he had eaten of her flesh. In this case, the victim was a purchased slave, not a relative of the donor. The child was killed and beheaded by her owner, who then divided the corpse into four parts by cutting it "down the centre and across the middle". The flesh was cooked and eaten by the members of the society; some who had not been able to be present during the ceremony also received their parts and ate them later.

In another trial a few years later, a man stated that another member of the society had volunteered his niece for sacrifice. After the girl had been stabbed to death with a large knife and cut into pieces, all her flesh was roasted over an open fire and eaten by members of the society, including the witness. The most important members could choose their preferred parts, while the others had to be satisfied with the remainders. Everything was eaten, including the edible organs; only the girl's bones and skull, picked clean of all flesh, were left behind when the feast was finished. Due to this testimony and other evidence, the girl's uncle was found guilty of murder and later executed. Other trials showed similar patterns of men volunteering dependents, often relatives, for sacrifice and consumption. While all members of the society seem to have been adult men, the eaten victims were usually "young boys and girls".

==== Civil wars ====
In the 1980s, Médecins Sans Frontières, the international medical charity, supplied photographic and other documentary evidence of ritualized cannibal feasts among the participants in Liberia's internecine strife preceding the First Liberian Civil War to representatives of Amnesty International. Amnesty International declined to publicize this material; the Secretary-General of the organization, Pierre Sane, said at the time in an internal communication that "what they do with the bodies after human rights violations are committed is not part of our mandate or concern". There were also reports of child sacrifice followed by consumption of body parts practised by the ULIMO, led by Joshua Milton Blahyi, who later became a Christian evangelical preacher. The existence of cannibalism on a wide scale in Liberia was subsequently verified.

A few years later, reports of cannibal acts committed during the Second Liberian Civil War and Sierra Leone Civil War emerged.

== Northern Central Africa ==
=== 19th century ===
Various sources indicate that some groups of the Azande, who live north of the Congo Basin and in its north-eastern regions, ate human flesh, especially during and after war campaigns.

=== 20th century to present ===
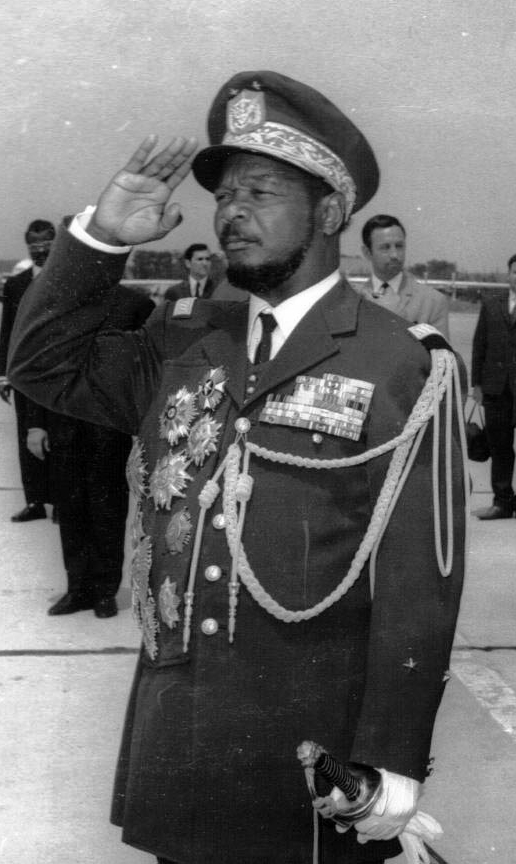
Jean-Bédel Bokassa, self-crowned emperor suspected of cannibalism

Cannibalism has also been reported from the Central African Republic. Jean-Bédel Bokassa ruled the country from 1966 to 1979 as a dictator and finally as a self-declared emperor. Rumors that he liked to dine on the flesh of opponents and political prisoners were substantiated by several testimonies during his eventual trial in 1986/1987. Bokassa's successor David Dacko stated that he had seen photographs of butchered bodies hanging in the cold-storage rooms of Bokassa's palace immediately after taking power in 1979. These or similar photos, said to show a walk-in freezer containing the bodies of schoolchildren arrested in April 1979 during protests and beaten to death in the 1979 Ngaragba Prison massacre, were also published in Paris Match magazine. During the trial, Bokassa's former chef testified that he had repeatedly cooked human flesh from the palace's freezers for his boss's table. While Bokassa was found guilty of murder in at least twenty cases, the charge of cannibalism was nevertheless not taken into account for the final verdict since the consumption of human remains is considered a misdemeanour under CAR law. All previously committed misdemeanours had been forgiven by a general amnesty declared in 1981.

Further acts of cannibalism were reported to have targeted the Muslim minority during the Central African Republic Civil War which started in 2012.

== Congo Basin ==
=== 19th century ===
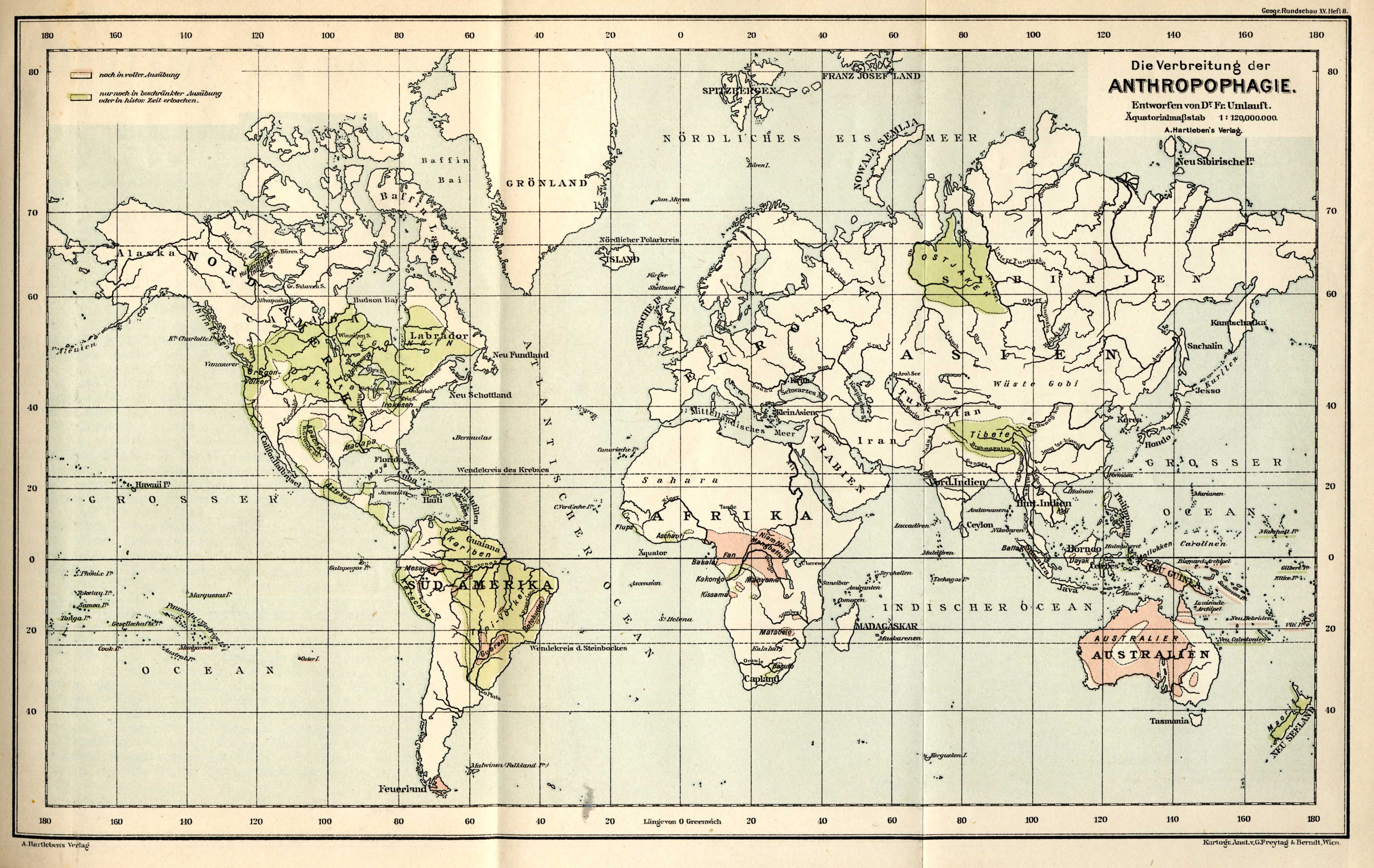
A German map published in 1893 depicting the distribution of human cannibalism as seen by the publishers. Pink areas thought to still be "fully" cannibalistic at that time; light green areas considered formerly or rarely cannibalistic.

Cannibalism was practised widely in some parts of the Congo Basin, though it was not universal. Some people, such as the Bakongo, rejected the practice altogether. In some other regions, human flesh was eaten "only occasionally to mark a particularly significant ritual occasion, but in other societies in the Congo, perhaps even a majority by the late nineteenth century, people ate human flesh whenever they could, saying that it was far tastier than other meat", notes the anthropologist Robert B. Edgerton.

Many people not only freely admitted to eating human flesh but were surprised when they heard that Europeans did not eat it. The anthropologist Emil Torday, who spent nearly ten years in the Congo Basin in the early 20th century, observed: "They are not ashamed of cannibalism, and openly admit that they practise it because of their liking for human flesh", with the primary reason for cannibalism being a gastronomic preference for such dishes. Torday once received "a portion of a human thigh" as a well-intended gift and other Europeans were offered pieces of human flesh as gestures of hospitality. People expected to be rewarded with fresh human flesh for services well performed and were disappointed when they received something else instead.

In addition to enemies killed or captured in war, the enslaved were frequent victims. Young slave children were at particular risk since they were in low demand for other purposes (and hence cheap), while their flesh was widely praised as especially delicious, "just as many modern meat eaters prefer lamb over mutton and veal over beef". Hence many "healthy children" had to die "to provide a feast for their owners". Such acts were not considered controversial – people did not understand why Europeans objected to the killing of slaves, while themselves killing and eating goats; they argued that both were the "property" of their owners, to be used as it pleased them.

A third group of victims were persons from other ethnic groups, who in some areas were "hunt[ed] for food" just like animals. Many of the victims, who were usually killed with poisoned arrows or with clubs, were "women and children ... who had ventured too far from home while gathering firewood or fetching drinking water" and who were targeted "because they were easier to overpower" and also considered tastier than adult men.

==== Trade in human flesh and people for consumption ====
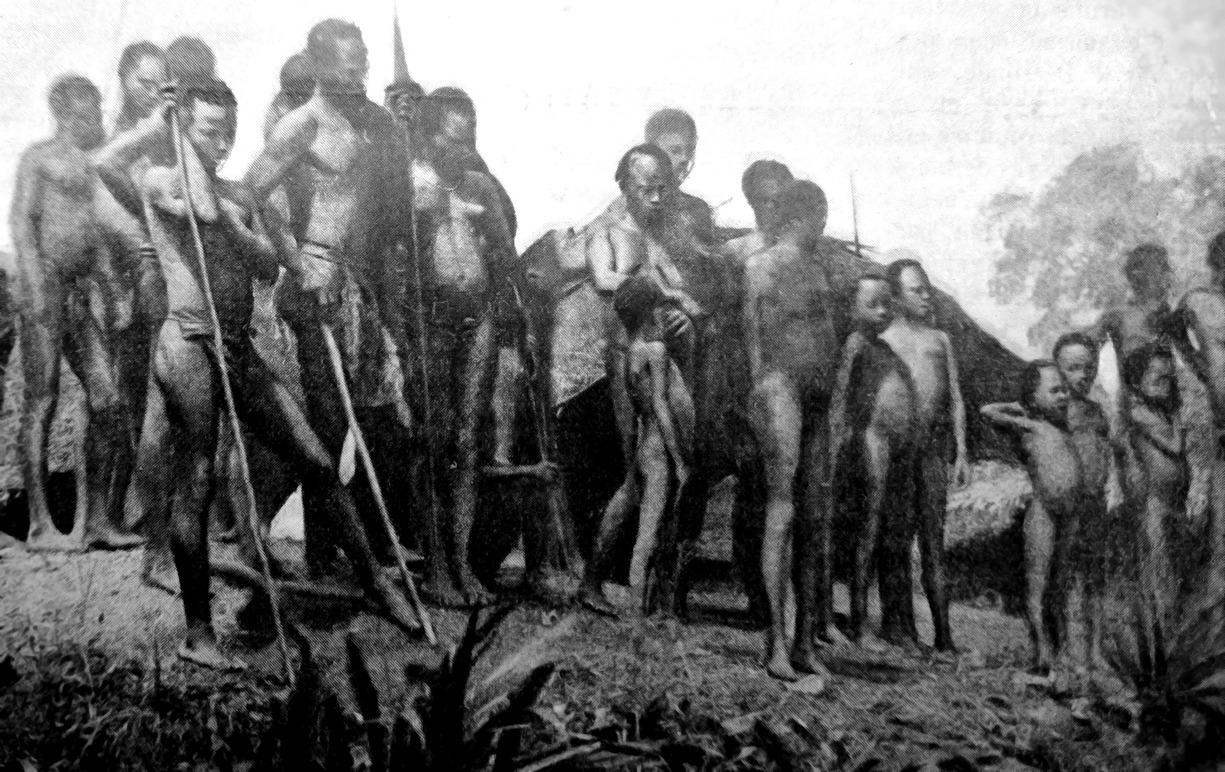
Children captured near the Lulonga River in a raid and about to be sold on the Ubangi River, where cannibalism was widespread, "as meat for slaughter". Photograph from 1889, published in Le Mouvement Géographique.

In some regions, there was a regular trade in enslaved people destined to be eaten, and the flesh of recently butchered slaves was available for purchase as well. Some people fattened slave children to sell them for consumption; if such a child became ill and lost too much weight, their owner drowned them in the nearest river instead of wasting further food on them, as a French missionary once witnessed. Human flesh not sold the same day was smoked, so it could be "sold at leisure" during subsequent weeks. Europeans were often hesitant to buy smoked meat since they knew that the "smoking of human flesh to preserve it was ... widespread", but once meat was smoked, its origin was hard to determine. In other cases, whole children, "disembowelled like sheep", were offered for sale, leaving no room for doubt.

Various reports indicate that living enslaved people were exposed on marketplaces so that purchasers could choose which body parts to buy before the victim was butchered and the flesh distributed.

It often happens that the poor creature destined for the knife is exposed for sale in the market. He walks to and fro and epicures come to examine him. They describe the parts they prefer, one the arm, one the leg, breast, or head. The portions which are purchased are marked off with lines of coloured ochre. When the entire body is sold, the wretch is slain.

This custom, reported around both the central Congo River and the Ubangi in the north, seem to have been motivated by a desire to get fresh rather than smoked flesh, since without refrigeration there was no other way to preserve flesh from spoiling quickly.

The trade continued in some cases even after the establishment of the Congo Free State. One colonial official wrote that he and his colleagues "were well aware that scores of slaves were being sold to supply meat to the people on the other side" of the Mongala River, but that neither the state nor the private companies active in the area did anything to suppress this deadly trade "in slaves for the shambles", instead wholly focussing on the profitable rubber extraction. Similarly, a German missionary reported an open trade in male and female slaves intended for consumption near the mouth of the Aruwimi River. Twice a week, new victims delivered by dugout canoe were "bound to poles [in the river], with their ankles dislocated, and sticking up to their heads in the water. After four days their flesh was tender for the kitchen and they were slaughtered." Only in 1906, more than 20 years after its foundation, the Free State dismantled this operation, executing a trader considered chiefly responsible for it. Even afterwards, slave children could easily be purchased for eating, with sellers considering the value of "their meat" a key factor in price negotiations.

In general, enslaved people and their flesh were not expensive. In some areas, human flesh was up to twice as expensive as animal flesh, while elsewhere, both prices were comparable. In regions where slaves were routinely purchased for the table, their prices were often "determined by the amount of meat" on their bodies. A young girl could be bought for the cost of a dwarf goat or even cheaper, while up to four goats were charged for big, fat men. "If there is as much to eat on a man as on three goats, he brings the price of three goats", a settler told the missionary Samuel Lapsley in the Kasaï region. Pigs were usually more expensive than slaves – "two ordinary women may be purchased for the price of one pig", observed the British artist Herbert Ward. This does not mean, however, that human flesh was a daily dish for many—instead, like in other pre-industrial societies, meat seems to have been a fairly rare delicacy that most people could eat only from time to time.

==== War cannibalism ====
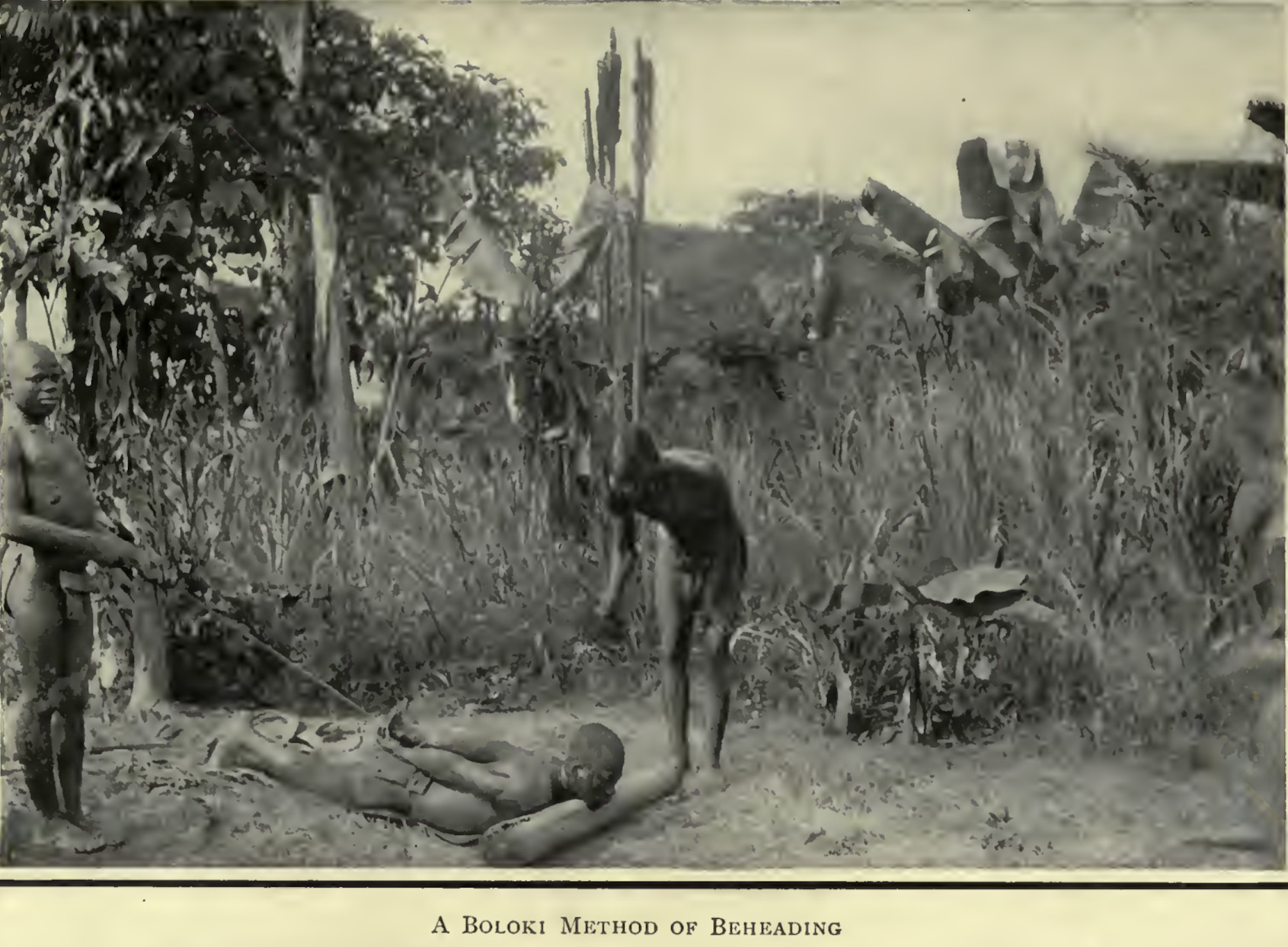
Prisoner about to be beheaded among the Boloki near the Ruki River. In this area, captured enemies were usually ransomed, sold into slavery, or else killed and eaten.

Killed or captured enemies made another sort of victims, even during wars fought by the colonial state. During the 1892–1894 war between the Congo Free State and the Swahili–Arab city-states of Nyangwe and Kasongo in Eastern Congo, there were reports of widespread cannibalization of the bodies of defeated combatants by the Batetela allies of the Belgian commander Francis Dhanis. Dhanis's medical officer, Captain Sidney Langford Hinde, repeatedly saw how the killed and wounded were "cut up to furnish a banquet" after battles by the auxiliary troops. Dhanis's officers ignored the "smell of cooked human flesh" coming from the camps of their local auxiliaries because "trying to punish or prevent them from feasting on the remains of their enemies would have been madness – they would have turned on us", as one of them explained.

When Nyangwe fell in early 1893 after a six-week siege, a large number of its defenders were killed and consumed. According to Hinde, the conquest of the city was followed by "days of cannibal feasting", during which hundreds were eaten, with only their heads being kept as mementos.

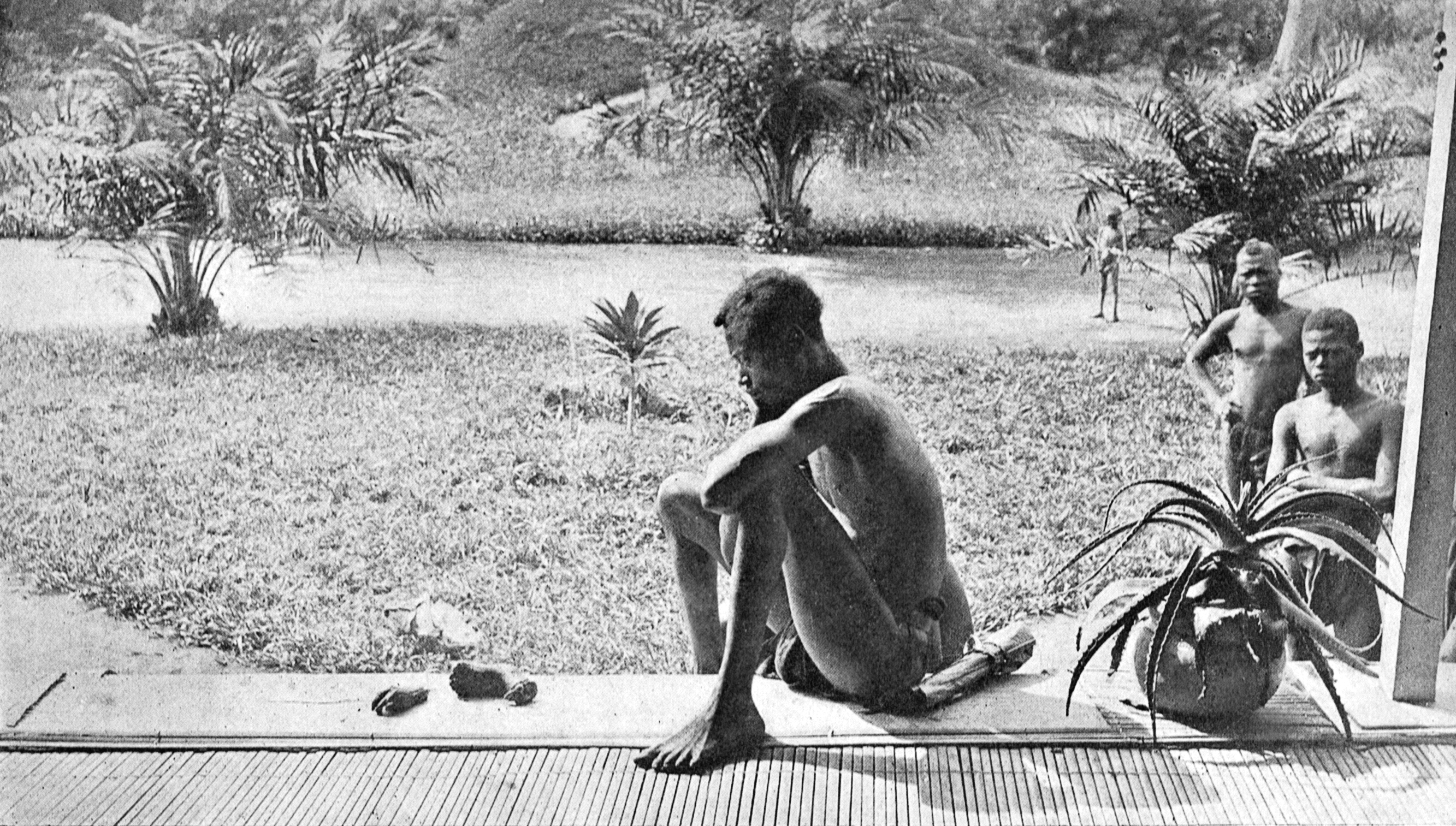
A Congolese man, Nsala, looking at the severed hand and foot of his five-year-old daughter who in 1904 was killed, cooked, and cannibalized by armed guards of a company holding a concession for rubber collection

Soon after, Nyangwe's surviving population rose in a rebellion, during whose brutal suppression the new government killed a thousand rioters. One young Belgian officer wrote home: "Happily Gongo's men ... ate them up [in a few hours]. It's horrible but exceedingly useful and hygienic.... I should have been horrified at the idea in Europe! but it seems quite natural to me here. Don't show this letter to anyone indiscreet". Hinde too commented approvingly on the thoroughness with which the cannibals "disposed of all the dead, leaving nothing even for the jackals", concluding that this "saved us, no doubt, from many an epidemic." Generally, the Free State administration seems to have done little to suppress cannibal customs, sometimes even tolerating or facilitating them among its auxiliary troops and allies. Some of its European officials reportedly got used to eating human flesh, developing "a taste" for it.

==== Attitudes ====
Torday and other observers note that while cannibalism was widespread, the Congolese societies were not ruleless. People did not randomly kill and eat others. Instead, there were clear conventions on who could or could not be eaten. Everybody was generally safe in their own communities – relatives and neighbours were very rarely eaten and certainly not killed for that purpose. In a few areas, the mortal remains of deceased relatives were consumed "out of piety" in non-violent acts of funerary cannibalism, but such acts were very far from the gastronomic cannibalism that could be found in many other places.

When people were killed for consumption, on the other hand, they always belonged to specific groups who were considered expendable or even good to get rid of: typically enemies and enslaved people and, in those regions where people from unrelated groups were regarded as legitimate prey, more or less any foreigner who did not belong to one's community or a community one had friendly relations with. Another group of victims were criminals considered guilty of a severe crime. These were usually not eaten in their home community, but in some regions, they were sold to neighbouring peoples who then killed and ate them, in effect executing the death penalty.

With this caveat – not everybody could be eaten, only certain persons – many Congolese did not share the negative attitudes towards cannibalism found in various other regions. "On the contrary, people expressed their strong appreciation" of the "meat that speaks" – as human flesh was often called – "and could not understand the hysterical reactions from the white man's side", as Kajsa Ekholm Friedman remarks. Those that could be eaten were treated with utter unconcern, with both remarks and behaviour indicating that people seem to have regarded them as little different from animals, failing to understand why one should not kill and eat them if it was acceptable to eat the latter.

When the missionary George Grenfell protested against the purchase of slaves for consumption, inhabitants of the Ubangi area replied: "You eat fowls and goats and we eat men; what is the difference?" In the Bangala region, people argued that "they had certainly done nothing reprehensible, [since] the men or women they had killed and eaten belonged to them in full ownership." Torday and others noticed that people did "not distinguish between the practice of eating the flesh of goats and that of human beings" and hence failed even to understand complaints by other meat eaters about cannibal customs, rejecting them as illogical and hypocritical.

Various accounts confirm that people failed to see anything wrong or reprehensible in their habit. From the Ubangi, a French colonial officer reported that cannibalism was practised "in broad daylight, not cynically, but as a natural thing ... one eats man as one would eat buffalo or wild boar." According to the French missionary Prosper Philippe Augouard, the locals, though frequently butchering and eating a slave child "as if they were an ox or a sheep", were friendly and "amiable" enough; they reacted with astonishment at the missionaries' refusal to "eat such a delicacy".

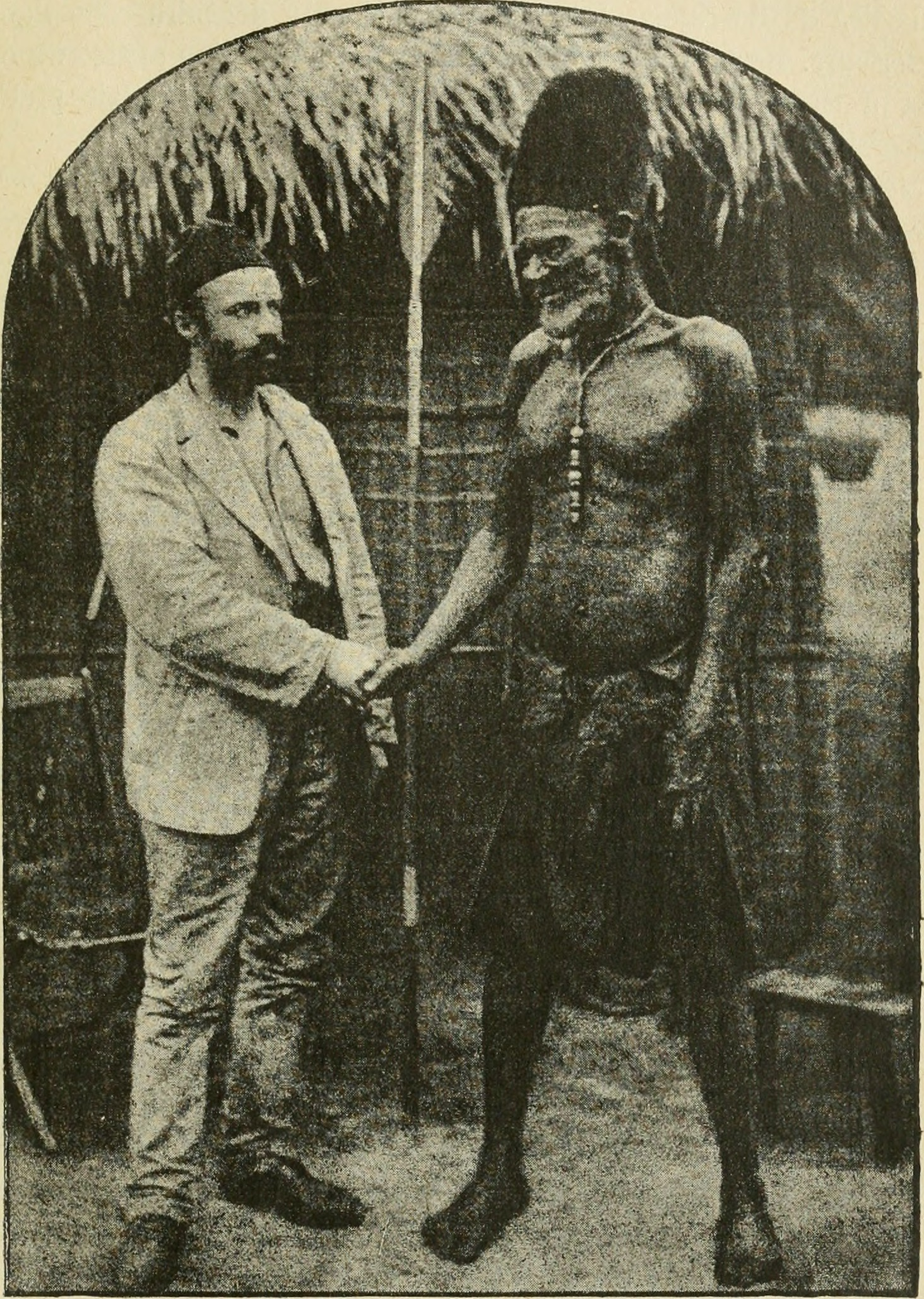
Camille Coquilhat with a Bangala chief, c. 1888

At Bangala Station, when a local chief paid a visit to the Belgian colonial officer Camille Coquilhat, he had a large party of guests in his canoe, as well as "the remaining half of [a] steamed man in an enormous pot" – a slave who had been slaughtered and cooked in the morning. When Coquilhat, horrified by the sight, forbade them to land, the chief thought he was joking. He could not understand Coquilhat's anger, arguing, like others, that "this man whom I put to death was my property" and that there was no difference between killing a goat and killing a slave. Ekholm Friedman comments:

Mongonga bought his victim in the market, as ordinary meat, and he invited his friends to a party with large quantities of beer. It seems like a daily-life activity, free from strong emotions. He was surprised about Coquilhat's criticism and compared his own purchase of the slave with the one of a goat. What mattered ... seems to have been that he had paid for his cannibal victim. He treated him like food, like cattle.

Hinde and other observers likewise note that slaves routinely had to "serve as food" in some areas and that the consumers explained this with a desire for "meat", apparently not considering the humanity of the eaten particularly important. Human flesh was, however, preferred for its taste, and several Bangala men told Hinde that a proper feast had to have a whole prisoner or slave as its centrepiece, while other mammals and birds were considered more ordinary fare. He found similar attitudes in other regions, such as around the Sankuru River. In one case, a young Songye chief asked to borrow the knife of the commandant of a recently established colonial post. The man used it to cut the throat of a little slave girl he had purchased, apparently unaware of any wrongdoing. When he was spotted cooking the girl's body, Hinde had him arrested and imprisoned for two months.

Disasi Makulo, a young Turumbu man educated by Christian missionaries, vividly experienced the contrast between local customs and the values of his teachers. When he returned in the mid-1890s to his birthplace, the villagers held "a great feast", for which they wanted to slaughter two enslaved people in addition to goats and dogs. Makulo was "greatly indignant" and intervened to save the slaves, but many villagers "wondered in amazement why I felt pity for these slaves. Others accused me of having prevented them from eating the delicious flesh of a human." When he returned at a later time, he observed that enslaved people were still being killed for consumption.

Several accounts indicate that the cannibals, while not deliberately cruel, were also unconcerned about making their victims suffer. Instead of being killed quickly, "persons to be eaten often had both of their arms and legs broken and were made to sit up to their necks in a stream for [up to] three days, a practice said to make their flesh more tender, before they were killed and cooked." Both adults and children and also animals, such as birds and monkeys, were routinely subjected to this treatment before being slaughtered. The missionaries in the Ubangi area were troubled not only because slave children were eaten as a matter of course but also because many of these children had to spend their last night in great pain, placed in the river with broken limbs. But their owners were not bothered, pointing out that this would "macerate the meat and make it more tender". Their own "enjoyments" mattered more to them than the "agony" and the "lives of others", a mission historian commented.

Ekholm Friedman observes that Congolese cannibalism often seems to have been "strikingly profane", as many victims were not enemies eaten out of hatred, but "just meat bought at the market" or sometimes enslaved people "slain for refractory behavior", with no discernible distinction made between slaves and edible animals. Those destined to be eaten were kept like cattle. Once they were slaughtered and eaten, it often happened without "elaborate rituals" and without particular emotions, except for a "delight" at the "excellent" taste. Far from being a "primitive" custom, cannibalism was "associated with success and development", as Europeans noticed (often to their surprise). It was practised chiefly "by the most developed and politically powerful" groups, who were strong enough to subjugate and capture others or wealthy enough to buy enslaved people. Another author notes that the less well-off admired those sufficiently wealthy to dine on slaves regularly. Many women and children were among the eaten. Indeed, their flesh was often praised as even tastier than that of men. The eaters, however, (or at least those who could invite others to cannibal feasts) were typically men and often chiefs, who controlled most power and resources.

==== Origins and connections to international trade ====
The origins of Congolese cannibalism are lost in time. The oldest known references to it can be found in Filippo Pigafetta's Report of the Kingdom of Congo, published in the late 16th century based on the memories of Duarte Lopez, a Portuguese trader who had lived for several years in the Kingdom of Kongo. Lopez reported that farther up the Congo River, there lived a people who ate both killed enemies and those of their slaves whom they could not sell for a "good price".

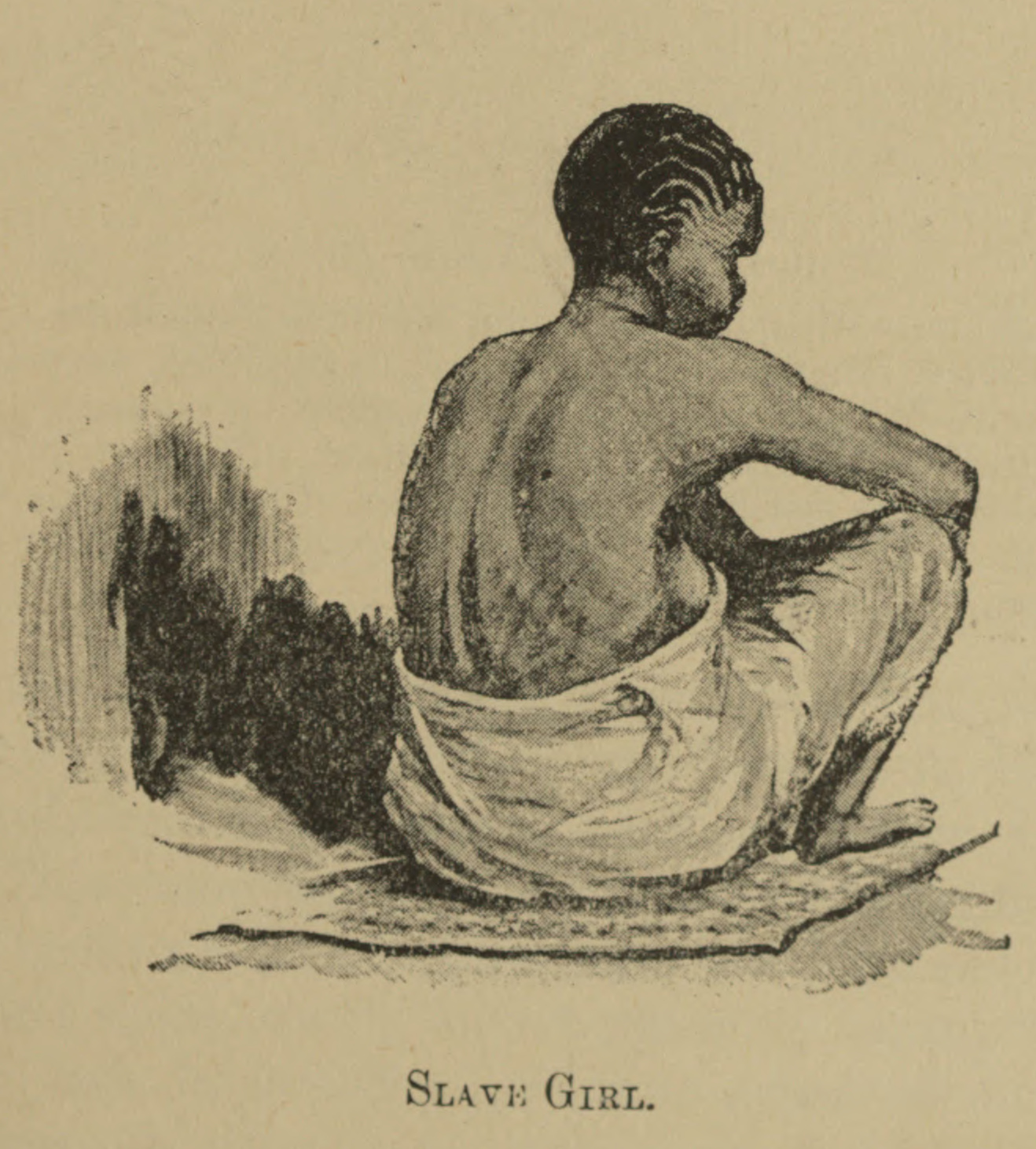
A Congolese slave girl – drawing by James Sligo Jameson, who watched while a 10-year-old girl he had purchased was killed, cooked, and eaten, allegedly to satisfy his curiosity about cannibalism

Oral records indicate that already at a time when slavery was not widespread in the Congo Basin, people assumed that anyone enslaved and sold would likely be eaten "because cannibalism was common, and slaves were purchased especially for such purposes". In the 19th century, warfare and slave raids increased in the Congo Basin as a result of the international demand for enslaved people, who could no longer be so easily captured nearer to the coasts. As a result, the consumption of slaves increased as well since most of those sold in the Atlantic slave trade were young and healthy individuals aged from 14 to 30, and similar preferences existed in the Arab–Swahili slave trade. However, many of the captives were younger, older, or otherwise considered less saleable, and such victims were often eaten by the slave raiders or sold to cannibals who purchased them as "meat".

While both enemies and slaves had already been eaten in earlier times, the international slave trade thus led to more violence and increased the number of available victims. As a result, the consumption of human flesh became much more common and spread into regions where it had been unknown or rare before.

Most of the accounts of cannibalism in the Congo are from the late 19th century when the Atlantic slave trade had come to a halt, but slavery still existed in Africa and the Arab world. Various reports indicate that around the Ubangi River, enslaved people were frequently exchanged against ivory, which was then exported to Europe or the Americas while the slaves were eaten. Some European traders seem to have directly and knowingly taken part in these deadly transactions, while others looked the other way. The local elephant hunters preferred the flesh of young human beings – four to sixteen was their favourite age range, according to one trader – "because it was not only more tender but also much quicker to cook" than the meat of elephants or other large animals.

==== Accounts by eyewitnesses and survivors ====
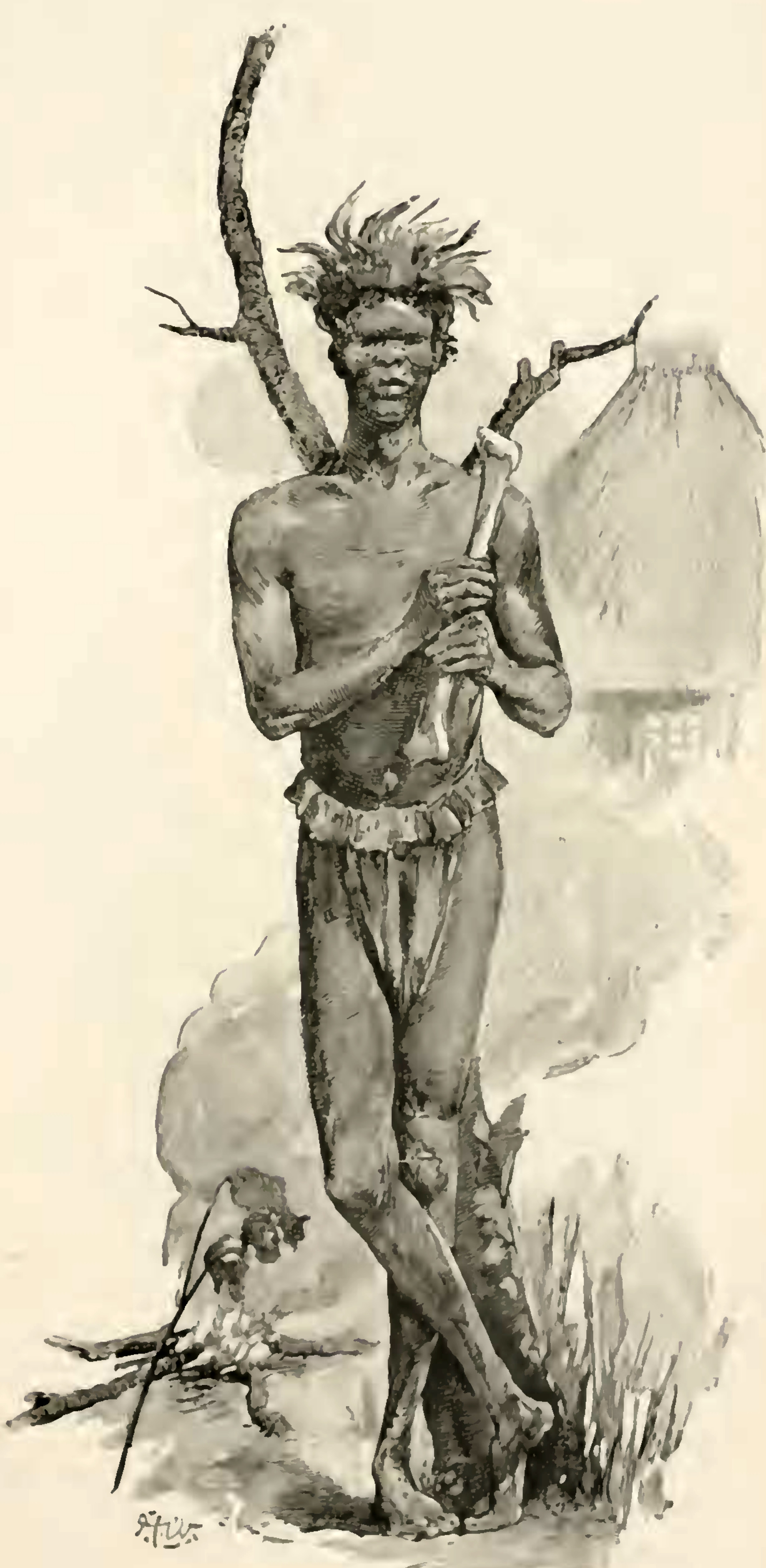
"A cannibal scene with human flesh roasting over the fire" – drawing by Herbert Ward (1891)

While sceptics such as William Arens sometimes claim that there are no credible eyewitness accounts of cannibal acts, there are numerous such accounts from the Congo. David Livingstone "saw human parts being cooked with bananas, and many other Europeans" – among them Hinde – "reported seeing cooked human remains lying around abandoned fires." Soldiers of the German explorer Hermann Wissmann saw how people captured and wounded in a slave raid were shot by a Swahili–Arab leader and then handed over "to his auxiliary troops, who ... cut them in pieces and dragged them to the fire to serve as their supper".

Visiting a village near the Aruwimi River, Herbert Ward saw a man "carrying four large lumps of human flesh, with the skin still clinging to it, on a stick", and soon afterwards "a party of men squatting round a fire, before which this ghastly flesh, exposed on spits, was cooking"; he was told that the flesh came from a man (or person) they had killed a few hours before. Another time, when "camping for the night with a party of Arab raiders and their followers", he and his companions felt "compelled to change the position of our tent owing to the offensive smell of human flesh, which was being cooked on all sides of us."

Near the Ubangi River, which formed the border between the Belgian and the French colonial enterprises, the French traveller Jacques d'Uzès saw local auxiliaries of the French troops kill "some women and some children" after a punitive expedition, then cooking their flesh in pots and "enjoy[ing]" it. Among the Mangbetu people in the northeast, Georg A. Schweinfurth saw a human arm being smoked over a fire. On another occasion, he watched a group of young women using boiling water for "scalding the hair off the lower half of a human body" in preparation for cooking it. A few years later, Gaetano Casati saw how the roasted leg of an enslaved woman was served at the court of the Mangbetu king. More eyewitness accounts could be added.

There are also some survivor's tales of people who barely escaped being eaten. Hinde describes an incident where 37 prisoners of war escaped during the Congo Arab war. Hinde's commander asked the local Songye chief to return them, but it turned out that "they had all been eaten". The only survivor, subsequently sent back by the chief, was a young servant boy of Hinde who had run away with the deserters and had been spared due to the influence of a friend in the village. His descriptions of how the others had been consumed "were quite sickening", notes Hinde.

Another survivor's report was recorded by a German missionary stationed near the confluence of the Aruwimi. One day, a boy aged about seven came running out of the jungle and begged for protection, his naked skin bloody and covered in dirt. He explained that he and his twin brother had been caught by a group of eight travellers who might have been looking for provisions while collecting food in the forest. They had tied up the children and put them in their canoe. When camping in the evening, after kindling a large fire, they had killed his brother for food. They

crouched around him, fixing his hands and feet, and then they cut his throat. I heard my Kitibo, my dear brother, groan, groan like a dying antelope. His groans became slower and weaker, and then he was dead ... My soul broke in pain! They carved him up and put his flesh into their pots.

He heard the men talk about smoking him later, but while they were distracted cooking his brother, he managed to get out of his ties and escape.

=== 20th century to present ===
Reports from the Belgian Congo indicate that cannibalism was still widely practised in some regions in the 1920s. When the American travel writer Hermann Norden visited the Kasai region in 1923, he found that "cannibalism was commonplace". People were afraid of walking outside of populated places because there was a risk of being attacked, killed, and eaten. Norden talked with a Belgian settler who "admitted that it was quite likely he had occasionally been served human flesh without knowing what he was eating" – it was simply a dish that appeared on the tables occasionally. A young local explained to Norden that, as in earlier times, it was eaten because it "tasted better than any other" meat. He added that their mutual Belgian acquaintance knew well enough that human flesh "tastes better than the flesh of a goat", apparently not believing that the latter had eaten it only unknowingly.

Other travellers heard persistent rumours that there was still an underground trade in enslaved people, some of whom (adults and children alike) were regularly killed and then "cut up and cooked as ordinary meat" around both the Kasai and the Ubangi River. The colonial state seems to have done little to discourage or punish such acts. There are also reports that human flesh was sometimes sold at markets in both Kinshasa and Brazzaville, "right in the middle of European life." Norden observed that cannibalism was so common that people talked about it quite "casual[ly]": "No stress was put upon it, nor horror shown. This person had died of fever; that one had been eaten. It was all a matter of the way one's luck held."

The culinary use of human flesh continued after World War II. In 1950, a Belgian administrator ate "meat ... from a young girl", afterwards describing it as "remarkably delicious". A few years later, a Danish traveller and his porters enjoyed in a north-Congolese village a "tasty stew" made with a woman's "soft and tender" flesh. As they later told it, both found out about the true origin of the meat only afterwards – the Dane had not bothered to ask, while the Belgian was initially told it was porcupine. Colonial officials estimated that similar cases were still common enough in the countryside but generally did not investigate unless confronted with fresh bones or other clear proof.

During the Congo Crisis, which followed the country's independence in 1960, body parts of killed enemies were eaten and the flesh of war victims was sometimes sold for consumption. In Luluabourg (today Kananga), an American journalist saw a truck smeared with blood. A police commissioner investigating the scene told her that "sixteen women and children" had been lured into a nearby village to enter the truck, kidnapped, and "butchered ... for meat." She also talked with a Presbyterian missionary, who excused this act as due to "protein need.... The bodies of their enemies are the only source of protein available."

In conflict situations, cannibalism persisted into the 21st century. During the first decade of the new century, cannibal acts have been reported from the Second Congo War and the Ituri conflict in the northeast of the Democratic Republic of the Congo. According to UN investigators, fighters belonging to several factions "grilled" human bodies "on a barbecue"; young girls were boiled "alive in ... big pots filled with boiling water and oil" or "cut into small pieces ... and then eaten." A UN human rights expert reported in July 2007 that sexual atrocities committed by rebel groups as well as by armed forces and national police against Congolese women went "far beyond rape" and included sexual slavery, forced incest, and cannibalism. In the Ituri region, much of the violence, which included "widespread cannibalism", was consciously directed against pygmies, who were believed to be relatively helpless and even considered subhuman by some other Congolese.

UN investigators also collected eyewitness accounts of cannibalism during a violent conflict that shook the Kasai region in 2016/2017. Various parts of killed enemies and beheaded captives were cooked and eaten, including their heads, thighs, and penises.

== East Africa ==
=== Prehistory ===
The oldest firm evidence of cannibalism comes from cut marks on bones uncovered in Turkana, Kenya, from 1.45 million years ago, indicating archaic humans were eating each other by this point. However, at this time and place, multiple human (Homo) species coexisted, so whether this was strictly speaking cannibalism is not certain. The shinbone replaces an older Homo habilis or Australopithecus skull dated to about 2 million years ago that was more controversial as evidence of cannibalism, which has markings that are now suggested to be due to natural causes. More extensive evidence of Human bones that have been "de-fleshed" by other humans goes back 600,000 years. The oldest Homo sapiens bones (from Ethiopia) show signs of this as well. However, despite archaeological evidence of its occurrence, the frequency of prehistoric cannibalism remains unknown and controversial.

=== 16th and 17th centuries ===
==== Zimba ====
A number of African oral history accounts and Portuguese documents mention a people known as Zimba, who around the 1590s invaded parts of northern Zambesia (today Zambia) and neighbouring regions. They may have been refugees from the south bank of the Zambezi River and are often described as cannibals. Oral sources describe them as mercenaries who fought for Lundu, a ruler over a part of the Maravi kingdom. Despite their reputed cannibalism, the Portuguese formed an alliance with the Zimba in order to drive the Ottomans out of Mombasa in the Battle of Mombasa (1589).

Afterwards the alliance fell apart, and in 1592, several hundred Portuguese and many of their local allies were killed in a fight against the Zimba for control of the area around Sena, a town on the Zambezi where the Portuguese had an important entrepôt. After another failed Portuguese attempt to defeat the Zimba militarily, both sides reached a peace agreement in the next year.

It is unclear whether all references to "Zimba" refer to the same people, since, as Joseph C. Miller states, there was "a real enough people called Zimba or Zimbo", but over time the name also came to be used "for any fierce bellicose group". The details of acts and practices attributes to Zimba are also disputed. The Dutch missionary and anthropologist Jan Matthew Schoffeleers writes that, because of the "striking overlaps" between written sources and local oral history, "one has to take such information seriously unless one has good reasons for not doing so".

Canadian historian Eric Allina argues against dismissing the "colourful descriptions of cannibalism" recorded by the Portuguese missionary João dos Santos "as a product of European myth-making". He notes that internal evidence shows these descriptions as coming from local African sources rather than being fabrications by dos Santo or other Europeans. Without committing himself to whether the Zimba and neighbouring groups such as the Mumbo and the Macua actually practised cannibalism, Allina sees two possible explanations: either that the descriptions of such acts were meant as metaphorical criticism of the general devastation left by large and reckless armies who "destroyed" and "devoured" everything they encountered, or else that the killing and consumption of enemies and captured civilians was indeed a part of their strategy of exploiting the regions they attacked to the fullest. Some incidents recorded by dos Santos are quite specific, making metaphor seem less likely; for example, he describes that when two Macua merchants in Mozambique Island failed to sell a slave woman for the price they had hoped for, they slaughtered her and consumed her body over the next several days.

==== Lake Victoria ====
Oral history accounts collected among the Sukuma people south of Lake Victoria are full of references to the cannibalistic practices of a people that settled in the area in the early 17th century. Various accounts describe them as immigrants from the eastern Congo Basin; their leader's name is sometimes given as Nkanda. They settled in an area that today belongs to Tanzania's Meatu District, attacking and eating the local population. According to the oral traditions, the number of victims was substantial. While some people believe that the immigrants brought their cannibal customs with them, others state that they began to eat people only after settling down. The region was devastated by a severe famine from 1617 to 1623 and it is possible that the consumption of human flesh started as a reaction to the lack of other food. While the origins of the custom are uncertain, the oral accounts are in agreement that the cannibals abandoned their practice after several years, maybe because the famine had ended or because of pressure to confirm to local customs.

=== 19th century ===
A huge famine devastated Ethiopia in 1888–1892, caused by a rinderpest epizootic, which killed more than 90 per cent of all cattle, as well as "excessively hot and dry" weather that reduced harvests to a fraction of their usual yield. Witnesses estimated that half or more of the population starved in some regions. There were several reports of cannibalism, including of a man who killed and consumed his wife and of various mothers who ate their children. One woman was brought before the emperor and charged of having murdered seven children for food. She freely admitted this, explaining that she had waylaid and strangled playing children to get flesh to alleviate her hunger. Menelik II, shocked by her frank confession and her starved appearance, gave her food and clothing instead of punishing her, judging that "no one could be expected to stand up to the trouble of the times".

=== 20th century to present ===
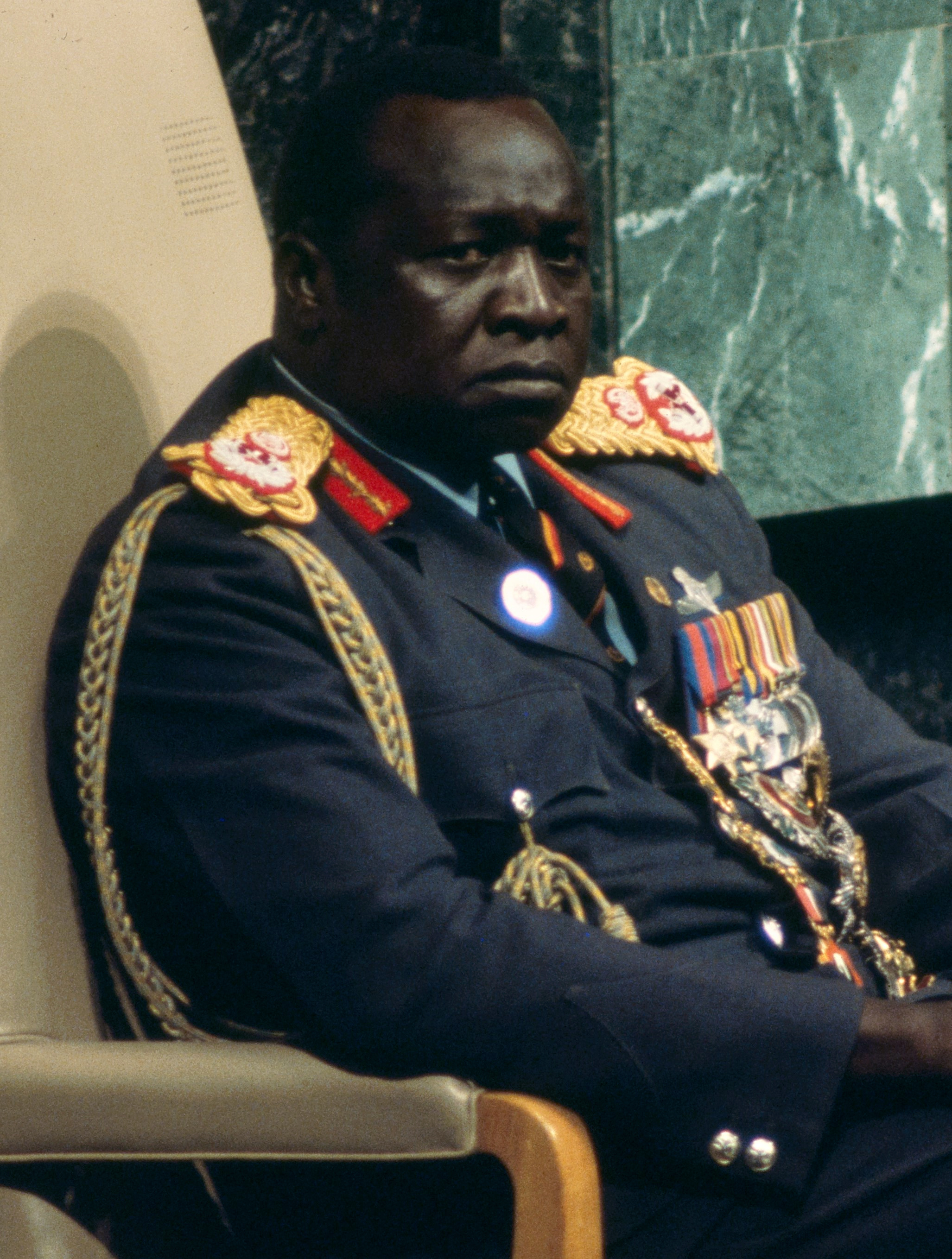
Idi Amin in 1975

Some accounts suggest that human flesh was sometimes eaten and occasionally also sold in parts of East Africa up to the middle of the 20th century. In 1937, a man was executed in Uganda "for boiling and eating a baby". In the early 1960s, the anthropologist Robert B. Edgerton was offered smoked human fingers as well as "a smoked slab of a young woman's buttocks, a truly 'choice cut'", according to the seller. Several years earlier, "two well-fattened children" were offered to a European shopping for a Christmas roast in Nyasaland (today Malawi).

In the 1970s, the Ugandan dictator Idi Amin was reputed to practise cannibalism. More recently, the Lord's Resistance Army has been accused of routinely engaging in ritual or magical cannibalism. There are also reports that witch doctors in the country sometimes use body parts of children in their medicine.

During the South Sudanese Civil War, cannibalism and forced cannibalism have been reported.

== Southern Africa ==
=== 19th century ===
Cannibalism was widely practised in the Zulu Kingdom and parts of Natal during times of famine, especially during a severe famine from 1802 to 1804. In such times, the bodies of deceased persons were often eaten out of necessity. Cannibalism was also practised in warfare, when dead enemies were sometimes consumed out of convenience by troops that were far from home and lacked supplies, or because of a belief that doing so would increase the eaters' strength. Such acts became particularly frequent during the reigns of Zulu kings Shaka (ruled 1816–1828) and Dingane (ruled 1828–1840), despite attempts by the kings to stop them. Shaka's rule was a time of mass migrations, leading to chaos and multiple cases of cannibalism by people who had lost their livestock and lacked opportunities for agriculture during a time of violent disruption that became known as Difaqane or Mfecane.

Near Pomeroy was a group of villages whose inhabitants became feared for capturing travellers, who were either "eaten on the spot" or taken home as captives to be eaten later. While written and archaeological evidence is limited, "the oral evidence for the practice is compelling", according to researchers from the Talana Museum in Dundee, KwaZulu-Natal. Moshoeshoe I, the first king of Lesotho (ruled 1822–1870), subsequently helped to restore peace and order by allowing displaced Sotho people to settle in his kingdom. He accepted even those who had practised cannibalism, requesting only that they "mend their ways", but refraining from punishment.

=== 21st century ===
In 2017, a traditional healer in a village in South Africa's KwaZulu-Natal province was arrested after confessing that he had eaten human flesh. Eight human ears were discovered in a cooking pot in his house, in addition to other human body parts. The police suspected that he had planned to serve these body parts to his customers, claiming they "would convey money, power and protection". Some of the human remains belonged to a 25-year-old woman who had been missing for several weeks.

Several residents confessed to having knowingly eaten human flesh on the advice of the healer. South Africa's Traditional Healer's Organization condemned the acts of the suspect, calling him a "fake healer" and stressing that "ritual killings and the use of human tissue are not part of traditional healing".

== Black Africans as imagined or actual victims of white cannibals ==
Africans often believed that slaves taken across the Atlantic were to be eaten by their buyers, seeing this as the most plausible explanation for "the prodigious appetite of the Atlantic trade for human cargo". Similar beliefs existed in parts of East Africa, such as present‑day Uganda, where both European and Arab traders were thought to buy people for cannibalistic purposes because the purchased never returned. In some cases, desperate captives committed or attempted suicide to escape this fate. In 1737, about a hundred African men on the slave ship Prince of Orange jumped overboard in the harbour of Saint Kitts, after a local slave had told them, as a joke, that they would be eaten; 33 of them drowned. In 1839, the enslaved aboard the schooner La Amistad rebelled and killed most of the crew after rumours spread that they were to be slaughtered for food.

While such rumours were usually baseless, two years earlier a British cruiser had captured the Portuguese schooner Arrogante, which had tried to bring several hundred West African slaves to Cuba, circumventing the British blockade. More than 60 Africans had died of hunger and diseases during the crossing, and the rest were severely undernourished. Many of the survivors reported "that one of the Africans on board the Arrogante had been murdered, and that, subsequently, the sailors had cooked pieces of his body and served them with rice to the rest of the Africans." Half a dozen witnesses had seen "how the Portuguese sailors took Mina behind a sail that they had put up across the deck to stop the rest of the Africans from witnessing what was about to happen." One "who had peeped through the holes in the sail ... described how they cut Mina's throat 'with a long knife'". Several enslaved girls saw how "the flesh of Mina had been cut into small pieces and ... cooked in the big pot destined for the Africans." One of them added "that the sailors had also cooked the liver and heart of Mina in their own smaller pot, and then had eaten those parts themselves", and another witness confirmed this observation.

The British colonial authorities in Jamaica decided not to press charges against any of the Portuguese sailors, mostly based on the argument that they considered the ship's captain – who was known to have directed at least six slave voyages – too "inoffensive" to be capable "of such a horrible transaction". Historian Manuel Barcia observed that this was not the only case where accusations of "White cannibalism" by Black victims of the slave trade were dismissed, and speculated that, "sheltered by distance, isolation, and lawlessness while at sea, other similar instances may have indeed taken place between the sixteenth and the nineteenth centuries".

A number of accounts from the Belgian Congo in the 1920s and 1950s report that white settlers and travellers occasionally ate human flesh when it was served in local contexts, afterwards stating they had been unaware of what they were eating, while usually praising the taste. Locals were not always convinced that they had not known. In the 1920s, a young man reminded a Belgian acquaintance that he (the Belgian) knew human flesh to taste better than goat; the Belgian admitted he had likely eaten it on some occasions without realizing it. In East Africa in the 1950s and 1960s, human flesh and fattened children were offered to some white people shopping for meat, but there is no evidence that they actually bought such goods.

While Black people were not literally eaten in Europe, they were rhetorically treated as edible. In France from the 1890s to the 1940s, the name tête de nègre (Black person's head) was widely used for a dessert – a domed rice pudding covered in chocolate. Advertisements for that dessert routinely featured images of Black people, and magazines described its supposed resemblance to a Black person's head as "amusing". Similarly, chocolate-coated marshmallow treats were – and in some cases still are – sold under the name Mohrenkopf (Moor's head) in German-speaking countries. Despite controversy and boycotts, at least one Swiss producer still uses this name as of 2026. In Flanders, these treats are colloquially known as negerinnentetten (Black women's boobs).

== See also ==
- Cannibalism in Asia
- Cannibalism in Europe
- Cannibalism in Oceania
- Cannibalism in the Americas
- Child cannibalism
- List of incidents of cannibalism

== Bibliography ==
- Burns, Alan (1963). History of Nigeria (6 ed.). London: George Allen and Unwin.
- Edgerton, Robert B. (2002). The Troubled Heart of Africa: A History of the Congo. New York: St. Martin's Press.
- Ekholm Friedman, Kajsa (2013). Catastrophe and Creation: The Transformation of an African Culture. London: Routledge.
- Hogg, Garry (1958). Cannibalism and Human Sacrifice. London: Robert Hale.
- Isichei, Elizabeth (1977). Igbo Worlds: An Anthology of Oral Histories and Historical Descriptions. London: Macmillan.
- Jewsiewicki, Bogumil; Mumbanza mwa Bawele (1981). "The Social Context of Slavery in Equatorial Africa during the Nineteenth and Twentieth Centuries". In Lovejoy, Paul (ed.). The Ideology of Slavery in Africa. Beverly Hills: Sage.
- Lewis, David Levering (1995). The Race to Fashoda: Colonialism and African Resistance. New York: Henry Holt.
- Nyamnjoh, Francis B. (2018). "Introduction: Cannibalism as Food for Thought". Eating and Being Eaten: Cannibalism as Food for Thought. Bamenda: Langaa. pp. 1–98. doi:10.2307/j.ctvh9vtgp.
- Siefkes, Christian (2022). Edible People: The Historical Consumption of Slaves and Foreigners and the Cannibalistic Trade in Human Flesh. New York: Berghahn. ISBN 978-1-80073-613-9.
- Tannahill, Reay (1975). Flesh and Blood: A History of the Cannibal Complex. New York: Stein and Day. ISBN 978-0-8128-1756-0.
- Van Reybrouck, David (2014). Congo: The Epic History of a People. New York: Ecco.
