= Leopard Society =

Actual or suspected secret societies

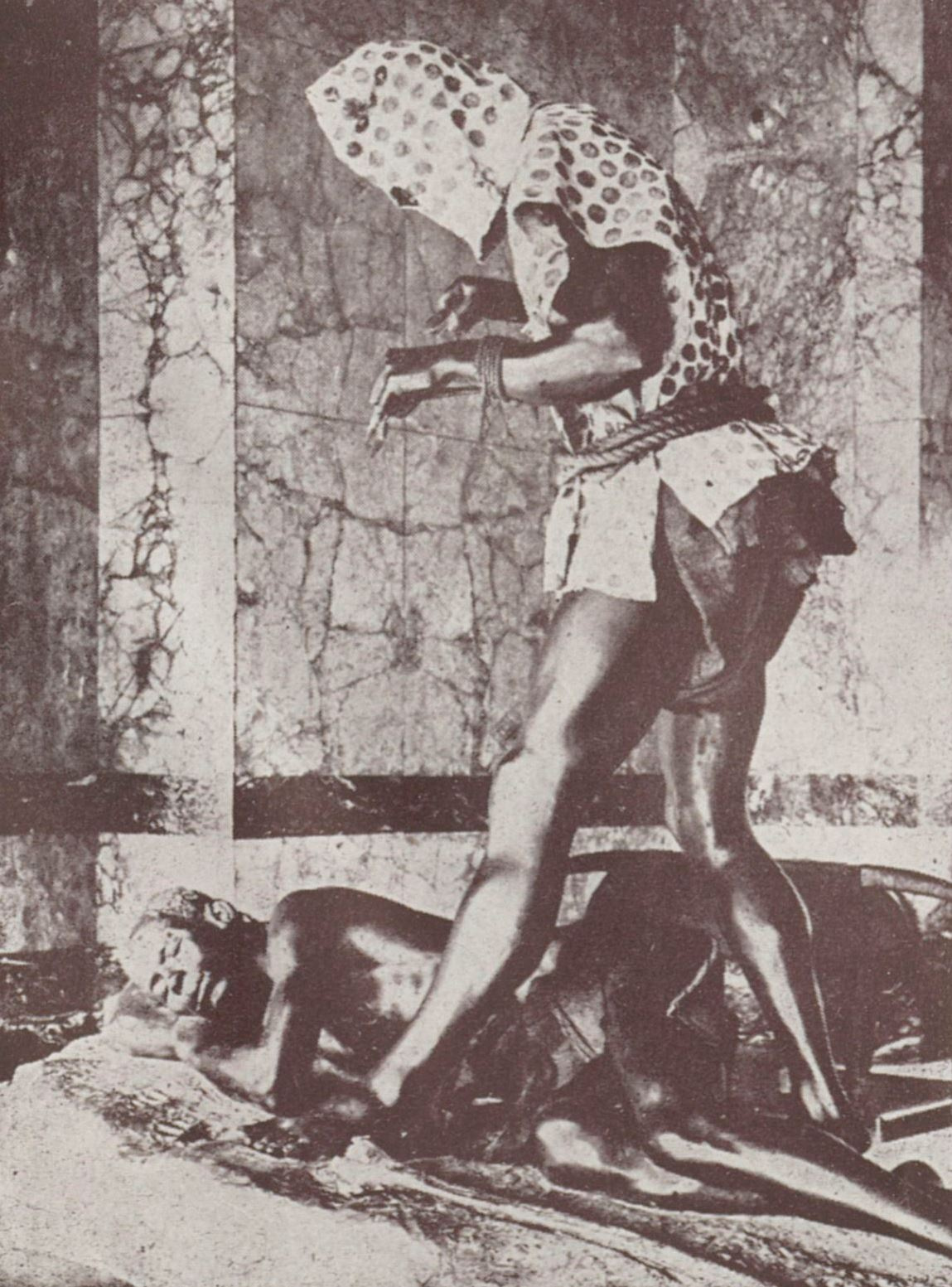
A sculpture by Paul Wissaert depicting a leopard man (1913)

Leopard Society, leopard men, and human leopards were names used for actual or suspected secret societies that operated in West and Central Africa from the late 19th to the mid-20th century. Such societies existed in several African regions and were generally independent of each other. The possibly earliest reference to one of them in Western literature can be found in George Banbury's Sierra Leone, or the White Man's Grave (1888). In Western culture, depictions of such societies have been used to portray Africans as barbaric and uncivilized.

== Accounts ==
Leopard men were an actual phenomenon, but one that was badly understood by colonial administrators and other outsiders, especially European ones. Historical accounts of their acts often misunderstood their motives and modes of operation, mixing "spectacular hearsay and rumour" with possibly accurate information. Moreover, outside accounts often failed to distinguish between different societies of "human leopards", instead blending all their activities together.

=== West Africa ===
==== Liberia ====
During field research in the 1960s among the Mano people in north-central Liberia, the American anthropologist James Riddell collected detailed statements about the Leopard and Crocodile Societies that had been active in that area, including from former members of these societies. They had comprised men from different towns and their primary purpose had been to organize trade between these towns, which were otherwise independent political units. Only men who could command the labour of many dependants were allowed to join, as the trade organization and the transport and protection of trade goods were labour-intensive. Those who wanted to join had to sacrifice a member of their "own domestic group in a cannibalistic feast" to prove that they had sufficiently many dependants whose services they could contribute. The supposed waylaying of travellers was only a trick to hide the connection between the victim and the man who had chosen to sacrifice them. The cannibal feasts, on the other hand, were real, according to several old members of the society interviewed by Riddell.

In the 1920s, Lady Dorothy Mills spoke with several district commissioners who tried to juridically prosecute members of the Leopard Society engaged in cannibal murders. She noted: "The members will offer and help to procure some one of their own family for the sacrifice. A man will offer up his wife or his child or his young brother". To avoid suspicions, the chosen victim was usually kidnapped outside their home, but Mills also spoke with a man who had witnessed how a group of "Leopards" raided a house, carrying away a man and a boy who had been sleeping there, supposedly as victims for their next feast.

In a criminal trial in the 1900s, a member of the Leopard Society confessed that he had been present when a girl donated by another member of the society had been murdered and that he had eaten of her flesh. In this case, the victim was a purchased slave, not a relative of the donor. The child was killed and beheaded by her owner, who then divided the corpse into four parts by cutting it "down the centre and across the middle". The flesh was cooked and eaten by the members of the society; some who had not been able to be present during the ceremony also received their parts and ate them later.

In another trial a few years later, a man stated that another member of the society had volunteered his niece for sacrifice. After the girl had been stabbed to death with a large knife and cut into pieces, all her flesh was roasted over an open fire and eaten by members of the society, including the witness. The most important members could choose their preferred parts, while the others had to be satisfied with the remainders. Everything was eaten, including the edible organs; only the girl's bones and skull, picked clean of all flesh, were left behind when the feast was finished. Due to this testimony and other evidence, the girl's uncle was found guilty of murder and later executed. Other trials showed similar patterns of men volunteering dependants, often relatives, for sacrifice and consumption. While all members of the society seem to have been adult men, the eaten victims were usually "young boys and girls".

==== Sierra Leone ====
In neighbouring Sierra Leone, various reports of killings attributed to societies of human leopards, crocodiles, and chimpanzees emerged during the colonial period. Members of these societies were said to kill their victims as human sacrifices and to ritually consume them. A number of chiefs, headmen, traders, and other wealthy men were accused by others — sometimes rival chiefs – of participating in such acts. Often women and children – frequently enslaved children – disappeared while running errands or under other suspicious circumstances and were thought to have become victims of human leopards or crocodiles.

As those declared guilty by the diviners could be enslaved or even burned to death, baseless accusations of involvement in such acts may have been driven by a desire to eliminate rivals or oppressors. While it is not clear whether such accusations were always baseless, the colonial authorities were unable to find actual traces of frequently mentioned objects, such as dresses that looked like leopard skins and knives resembling leopard claws, giving room to doubts at least regarding these details.

Anthropologist Carol P. MacCormack states that the Human Leopard Society and the Human Alligator (or Crocodile) Society were two secret societies that doubtless existed among the Sherbro people, though there is less certainty about the acts they engaged in. There were organized similarly to more widespread secret societies such as the Poro and the Sande. Membership in them required a successful initiation and was for life, with the societies helping their members to realize their aims, using various powerful "medicines" for this purpose. Joint feasting played a role in all such societies, but while the Poro and Sande ate animal and vegetable food on such occasions, the Leopards and Alligators allegedly feasted on "cooked human flesh", while using human fat in the preparation of their "medicines". Reports of the feasts of the Leopard Society indicate that they were usually held at nighttime and in the forest rather than within villages.

Both men and women were accepted as members into these societies, and children and adults of either gender were reportedly considered suitable for eating. Accounts of these societies state that members who had eaten human flesh at a feast sooner or later had to give up somebody they "owned" as victim for another feast, thus repaying the debt of the flesh they had eaten. The person sacrificed for eating was often a slave or a younger relative, with adolescents of low status most frequently mentioned as victims. MacCormack observes that there is a lot of ambiguity in the descriptions of the acts of the two societies. Since accusations of cannibalism were used as "a political weapon" during the colonial period, directed against rival groups to weaken them and bring them into discredit, claims of cannibal feasting may have been fabricated for this purpose, but that at least some such statements referred to actual practices cannot be ruled out either.

==== Nigeria ====
In late colonial Nigeria, a series of actual or suspected murders committed in the Calabar province in the 1940s became known as "man-leopard murders". In 1948, the police described "196 men, women and children" as "victims of the man-leopard murders", adding that there were likely other cases that had been overlooked or not reported. As there were real leopard in the area that sometimes killed people, attacks by animals were hard to distinguish from simulated ones committed by humans. In a number of cases, however, the forensic evidence clearly revealed the attackers to be human. Rumours in the local population blamed a "secret leopard society", but whether such a society really existed in the area remains uncertain.

A man arrested in 1945 as a suspect in several murder cases confessed that he was indeed a member of a secret leopard society, declaring that a purpose of the murders was to acquire and sell human body parts for making medicine from them. He added that the society also acted as contract killers, accepting fees from people who wanted to get rid of somebody, whether for revenge or other reasons. He said that the society to which he belonged was limited to his village, but that similar societies operated in other villages. A police officer subsequently admitted having known of the society for more than a year, leading to the suspicion that parts of the police had colluded with the murderers.

Upon searching another suspect's house, the police found masks and garments that could be used to give people a leopard-like appearance. They also found it suspicious that local chiefs had let a man they found guilty of involvement in a human-leopard murder get away with a fine. In late 1945, a local chief and his son were themselves arrested as murder suspects upon the statement of a witness that he had seen the son stabbing a person who had initially been considered the victim of a wild leopard. Despite a number of accusations and witness statements, however, the police found it hard to find evidence clearly proving anyone's guilt. Masks, costumes, and weapons thought to be used in simulated leopard attacks were found in the households of various suspects, but this turned out insufficient for arresting and charging anyone, since "masquerade costumes and sharp farming tools could be found in any household".

In 2003, the historian David Pratten spoke with a man whose father, named Echiet, had once prepared "medicine" to use in revenge murders. In one case a man had used this medicine to murder a woman who had reneged an earlier promise to marry him. Echiet had also told his clients how to acquire costumes to conceal themselves and how to manufacture "a glove with three knives bound to the fingers" to use as murder weapon. He provided a number of clients with "medicine" and advice for murdering others with little risk of being caught. When a police post was established nearby, he ceased doing so to avoid raising suspicions.

Generally, police found that a majority of the victims of fake leopard attacks were female and that about 30% of them were children (usually girls). They were often killed in the evening while walking on a bush path, often by stabbing with a machete or knife, less often by clubbing. The body was often mutilated – frequently the head and neck were removed, sometimes together with parts of a shoulder and arm. The dead body was dragged into the bush, out of immediate sight. When suspected attackers could be identified, a personal motive was usually found, such as a quarrel over land, a bride price payment, or an unpaid debt. In such cases, the attackers targeted either the person with whom they had the conflict or one of their children. When witnesses saw the murderers, they often reported them as wearing a mask, never a complete leopard costume.

After 1947, the phenomenon of "human leopard" murders largely disappeared from the region. In 1948, real leopards killed four children and mauled several more, but there were no adult victims and no faked leopard-style attacks took place. A consultation held in 1947 revealed that the inhabitants of the region generally attributed the murders to personal conflicts over issues such as debt, child betrothal, and dowry payments, with people taking personal revenge because they were unsatisfied with the decisions reachable via local courts. Pratten too considers it most likely that there was no organized society behind the murders, but that "a collapse of trust" in social arrangements led to the murders, with the old social institutions no longer working under colonial rule and the courts set up by the state not finding widespread acceptance.

==== Postcolonial period ====
Encounters with suspected remnants of the, or a, Leopard Society in the postcolonial era have been described by Donald MacIntosh and Beryl Bellman.

=== Central Africa ===
==== Anyoto ====
In the eastern Congo Basin, the Anyoto or Anioto society was active between c. 1890 and the 1930s, attacking and murdering people and deliberately leaving traces meant to give the impression of leopard attacks. Because of this, its members were often called "leopard men" in sources written in European languages. The society consisted of several chapters, which were often controlled by village chiefs and acted largely independently from each other, sometimes as rivals. Its members were widely suspected of eating body parts of their victims, but there is little conclusive evidence that this was indeed the case.

The Anyoto society seems to have emerged as a resistance movement against Swahili-speaking slave-trading chiefs who dominated the region in the 1890s. Later it turned against the colonial government. Many of its victims were people employed by the government, but there is also evidence that its members were hired to intervene in "private animosities", such as cases of men competing for the same woman or situations where someone wanted revenge. Attacks often focused on relatives of the target, frequently children.

Anyoto membership was often passed on within families from father to son or from maternal uncle to nephew. Those who wanted to be newly accepted into the society without having family members in it sometimes had to give a family member – often a wife or child – to the society as human sacrifice to prove their loyalty and discretion. Usually simple knives were used to kill the victims. While one key informant claimed that artificial leopard claws were used to mimic leopard attack, most other convicted Anyoto members denied this. A number of statements indicate that though imitate claws were rarely used to kill, they were sometimes used to disfigure the dead victim, "tearing chunks of flesh out of the body". However, knives were also used in this context when it was more practical, such as for cutting off limbs.

==== Vihokohoko ====
The Vihokohoko was another group of "leopard men" who killed various people between c. 1880 and the early 1940s. They were active in the region around Beni on the edge of the Ituri Rainforest. Local oral traditions indicate that it was established in response to the occupations by first Zanzibari slave and ivory raiders and later the Belgian colonizers. Before they were accepted into the society, young men underwent a harsh training period lasting up to three months, during which they learned how to carry out and defend against attacks and how to imitate the calls of animals. As final test they had to commit a murder. The victim, chosen by the society, often was a close relative of the initiate.

Contrary to what some accounts claim, the Anyoto and Vihokohoko members never seem to have believed that they became actual leopards during their killings.

Colonial officials long remained sceptical, dismissing rumours about leopard men as unsubstantiated and attributing their acts to actual leopards or other reasons. Only in the 1920s, this attitude changed, with the government beginning to take leopard men attacks serious and trying to prosecute the perpetrators. One series of murders was discovered accidentally by a colonial administrator overhearing members of the society. The supposed gang leader admitted his guilt during interrogation. Ten persons were found guilty of more than 30 murders and cannibalism and hung in 1920. Two local chiefs suspected of involvement were not punished since their guilt could not be proven.

Official sources registered 32 murders attributed to leopard men within a 10-month period in late 1933 to 1934 in the Beni region alone, as well as six failed attempts. In a trial in Wamba in 1933, nine persons, including a chief named Mbako, were found guilty of leopard murders; they were subsequently hung. Mbako and his wives also admitted that cannibalism has been a part of the process – human "flesh obtained in the attacks had been sent to Mbako and ... was cooked by the women in his company and eaten by all".

Leopard men in the eastern Congo were also used by local chiefs to strengthen their authority, punishing those who did not pay them due respect as a warning. Europeans often misunderstood the motives behind the leopard-men killings, attributing them to "delusion or madness" and "uncontrolled animal-like urges" rather than understanding the political reasons behind them.

== In popular culture ==
=== Western fiction ===
From the 1900s onwards, stereotypical depictions of West African "leopard men" societies became a popular theme in Western fiction, including novels by Mary Gaunt. In the 1930s, they appeared in one of the Tintin comics by Hergé and in Edgar Rice Burroughs's novel Tarzan and the Leopard Men; in the 1940s, they featured in a radio play and several movies. They remained a popular topic in the 1950s and 1960s, especially in boys' fiction.

=== Art ===
Réorganisation (2002) by Congolese painter Chéri Samba depicts the struggle about whether the Wissaert sculpture (see image at top) should remain on display in the Royal Museum for Central Africa

In 1913, the Royal Museum for Central Africa in Tervuren, Belgium, acquired a sculpture by Paul Wissaert commissioned by the Belgium Ministry of Colonies depicting a leopard man preparing to attack a victim. The scene in the sculpture was appropriated by Hergé in Tintin in the Congo. The sculpture is depicted by Congolese artist Chéri Samba in Réorganisation (2002), commissioned by the Royal Museum, at the center of a tug-of-war between Africans trying to remove the sculpture from the museum, and whites trying to keep it there.

== See also ==
- Belgian colonial empire
- Cannibalism in Africa
- Colonization of the Congo Basin
- Crocodile Society
- Poro society

== Bibliography ==
- Beatty, Kenneth James (1915). Human Leopards: An Account of the Trials of Human Leopards Before the Special Commission Court, with a Note on Sierra Leone, Past and Present. London: Hugh Rees. Reprint: New York: AMS Press, 1978. ISBN 978-0-404-12006-1.
- MacCormack, Carol P. (1983). "Human Leopards and Crocodiles: Political Meanings of Categorical Anomalies". In Brown, Paula; Tuzin, Donald (eds.). The Ethnography of Cannibalism. Washington, D.C.: Society of Psychological Anthropology. pp. 51–60.
- Pratten, David (2007). The Man-Leopard Murders: History and Society in Colonial Nigeria. Bloomington: Indiana University Press. ISBN 978-0-253-34956-9. Also published by Edinburgh University Press (Edinburgh), ISBN 978-0-7486-2553-6.
- Riddell, James C. (1979). "The Gbannah Ma (Mano) in Two Economies". In Dorjahn, Vernon R.; Isaac, Barry L. (eds.). Essays on the Economic Anthropology of Liberia and Sierra Leone. Philadelphia: Institute for Liberian Studies.
- Van Bockhaven, Vicky (2009). "Leopard-Men of the Congo in Literature and Popular Imagination". Tydskrif vir Letterkunde. 46 (1): 79–94. ISSN 0041-476X.
- Van Bockhaven, Vicky (2013). The Leopard Men of the Eastern Congo (ca. 1890–1940): History and Colonial Representation (PDF) (PhD thesis). University of East Anglia.
