= Crocodile Society (disambiguation) =

Crocodile Society was a West African secret society that practised cannibalism.

Crocodile Society may also refer to:

- Crocodile Conservation Society in the Philippines, concerned with the Philippine crocodile
- International Crocodile Society, founded by Ross Allen (herpetologist)

== See also ==
- Crocodile § Biology and behaviour
- Crocodile Gang, a group in Southern Rhodesia headed by Emmerson Mnangagwa
- Die Krokodile, a literary circle in Münich 1856–1879
