= Crocodile Society =

West African society

The Crocodile Society was a West African secret society known for supposedly practising cannibalism. There is evidence that it existed in Liberia and Sierra Leone in the late 1800s and early 1900s.

== See also ==
- Cannibalism in Africa
- Leopard Society
- Poro society
