= Hermann Norden =

American travel writer (c. 1869–1931)

Hermann Norden FRGS (1868/1869–November 1931) was an American travel writer. He was a fellow of the Royal Geographical Society and the American Geographical Society.

Of German origin, Norden made his money as a cotton broker in South Carolina. He died in London after falling and fracturing his skull in Leicester Square, aged 62.

His book "White and Black in East Africa" was a great success, however it was criticised in African Affairs as "of a surface nature... marred by many inaccuracies, exaggerations and statements which are both sweeping and incorrect." His book "Byways of the Tropic Seas: Wanderings Among the Solomons and in the Malay Archipelago" was criticised in Nature as superficial and inaccurate.

For his book "Africa's Last Empire", he met Ras Tafari (Haile Selassi). His last book, A Wanderer in Indo-China, was published a week before his death.

== Books ==
- "From Golden Gate to Golden Sun: A Record of Travel, Sport, and Observation in Siam and Malaya by Norden". H. F. & G. Witherby, London, 1923.
- "Fresh Tracks in the Belgian Congo: From the Uganda Border to the Mouth of the Congo". H. F. & G. Witherby, London, 1924.
- "White and Black in East Africa". H. F. & G. Witherby, London, 1924.
- "Byways of the Tropic Seas: Wanderings Among the Solomons and in the Malay Archipelago". H. F. & G. Witherby, London, 1926.
- "Under Persian Skies: A Record of Travel by the Old Caravan Routes of Western Persia". H. F. & G. Witherby, London, 1928.
- "Africa's Last Empire: Through Abyssinia to Lake Tana and the country of the Falasha". H. F. & G. Witherby, London, 1930.
- "A Wanderer in Indo-China: The Chronicle of a Journey Through Annam, Tong-King, Laos, and Cambodgia, with Some Account of Their People". H. F. & G. Witherby, London, 1931.
