= Francis B. Nyamnjoh =

Cameroonian Professor of Social Anthropology (1961-)

Professor Francis B. Nyamnjoh FAAS FBA
- Born: 1961 (age 64–65); Bum, Cameroon
- Education: University of Yaoundé (BA, MA); University of Leicester (PhD)
- Awards: ASU African Hero; Eko Prize for African Literature; ASAUK Fage & Oliver Prize
- Scientific career
- Fields: Social anthropology
- Workplaces: University of Cape Town
- Thesis: Change in the concept of power amongst the Bum (MA) (1985)
- Website: https://www.nyamnjoh.com/

Francis B. Nyamnjoh (born 1961) is a Cameroonian Professor of Social Anthropology at the University of Cape Town. He was recipient of the annual "ASU African Hero 2013" award from the African Students Union at Ohio University, the 2014 Eko Prize for African Literature, and his book #RhodesMustFall: Nibbling at Resilient Colonialism in South Africa won the 2018 ASAUK Fage & Oliver Prize for the best monograph.

== Life and career ==
=== Early life and education ===
Francis B. Nyamnjoh was born in 1961 in Bum, Cameroon. He obtained his Bachelor of Arts (1984) and Master of Arts (1985) from the University of Yaoundé in Cameroon. His master's thesis was titled Change in the concept of power amongst the Bum. He earned a Doctor of Philosophy from the University of Leicester, in 1990.

=== Career ===
Nyamnjoh moved from the Council for the Development of Social Science Research in Africa (CODESRIA), where he held the position of Head of Publications from July 2003 to July 2009, to the University of Cape Town in August 2009 to take up a position as Professor of Social Anthropology.

== Research ==
Nyamnjoh has conducted considerable study and written extensively about Cameroon, Botswana, and generally African politics. He has taught sociology, anthropology, and communication studies at universities in Cameroon and Botswana. According to the South African National Research Foundation, he is a professor and researcher with a B1 rating (NRF). He is the chair of the editorial board of Langaa Research and Publishing Center in Bamenda (2005) and has served as Editorial Board Chair for the South African Human Sciences Research Council (HSRC) Press (2011-2019).

=== #RhodesMustFall ===
Nyamnjoh books include #RhodesMustFall: Nibbling at Resilient Colonialism in South Africa, This book, which is built on his previous book Insiders and outsiders: Citizenship and xenophobia in contemporary Southern Africa (2005), is - according to Nyamnjoh - a book on citizenship, rights, and entitlements in post-apartheid South Africa demonstrates how racism and its advantages still exist and that the field has not been levelled as some have assumed. It examines the issue of race in a culture still troubled by the lingering effects of apartheid, inequality, and attitudes of inferiority and inadequacy among the majority black population via the regular interactions and experiences of university students and lecturers where due to the ongoing renewal and addition of circles of privilege to a complex and long history of the growth of black sorrow, black voices and concerns in education are usually ignored. These problems are discussed against the backdrop of organised student protests that are roiling the nation's campuses and calling for change under the banner of "Black Lives Matter," as it examine the concerns that Rhodes Must Fall campaign raises regarding the benefits and drawbacks of exclusionary definitions of belonging due to its multifaceted complexity. From Nyamnjoh perspective: what might the modern "quick-footed makwerekwere" from Africa north of the Limpopo possibly have in common with the big imperialist of the past like the stripling Uitlander or foreigner Sir Cecil John Rhodes? According to Nyamnjoh, the solution lies in how human movement constantly pushes the limits of citizenship.

== Awards and honours ==
Nyamnjoh received the "Senior Arts Researcher of the Year" award in 2003. Nyamnjoh was given the University of Cape Town Excellence Award in October 2012 in recognition of his "exceptional contribution as a professor in the Faculty of Humanities", an award renewed in 2017 and again in 2022. In September 2021, he was elected as a fellow by the College of Fellows of the University of Cape Town, in recognition of his research. #RhodesMustFall: Nibbling at Resilient Colonialism in South Africa won the 2018 ASAUK Fage & Oliver Prize for the best monograph, he was recipient of the annual "ASU African Hero 2013" award from the African Students Union at Ohio University, the 2014 Eko Prize for African Literature.

Nyamnjoh was elected a Fellow of the Cameroon Academy of Sciences in 2011, the African Academy of Sciences in 2014, a fellow of the Academy of Science of South Africa in 2016, and an International Fellow of the British Academy in 2024.

== Selected books ==
- Nyamnjoh, Francis B. (May 2005). Africa's Media, Democracy and the Politics of Belonging. Zed Books. ISBN 978-1-84277-583-7.
- Nyamnjoh, Francis B. (2006). Insiders and Outsiders: Citizenship and Xenophobia in Contemporary Southern Africa. Zed Books. ISBN 978-1-84277-677-3.
- Nyamnjoh, Francis B. (2007). The Disillusioned African. Langaa Research and Pub. Common Initiative Group. ISBN 978-1-283-19822-6. OCLC 1156954447.
- Nyamnjoh, Francis B. (2015). C est l homme qui fait l homme: Cul-de-Sac Ubuntu-ism in Côte d'Ivoire. African Books Collective. ISBN 978-9956-762-52-1.
- Nyamnjoh, Francis B. (2016). #RhodesMustFall: Nibbling at Resilient Colonialism in South Africa. Langaa RPCIG. doi:10.2307/j.ctvmd84n8. ISBN 978-9956-763-16-0. JSTOR j.ctvmd84n8.
- Nyamnjoh, Francis B. (2017-03-15). Drinking from the Cosmic Gourd: How Amos Tutuola Can Change Our Minds. Langaa RPCIG. ISBN 978-9956-764-65-5.
- Nyamnjoh, Francis B. (2018). Eating and Being Eaten: Cannibalism as Food for Thought. Langaa RPCIG. doi:10.2307/j.ctvh9vtgp. ISBN 978-9956-550-96-8. JSTOR j.ctvh9vtgp. S2CID 242094304.
- Nyamnjoh, Francis B. (2018). The Rational Consumer: Bad for Business and Politics: Democracy at the Crossroads of Nature and Culture. Langaa RPCIG. doi:10.2307/j.ctvk3gmjt. ISBN 978-9956-550-14-2. JSTOR j.ctvk3gmjt. S2CID 158545824.
