= Paul Wissaert =

Belgian sculptor

- Born: 13 May 1885; Brussels, Belgium
- Died: 5 July 1972 (aged 87); Schaerbeek, Belgium
- Occupation: Sculptor

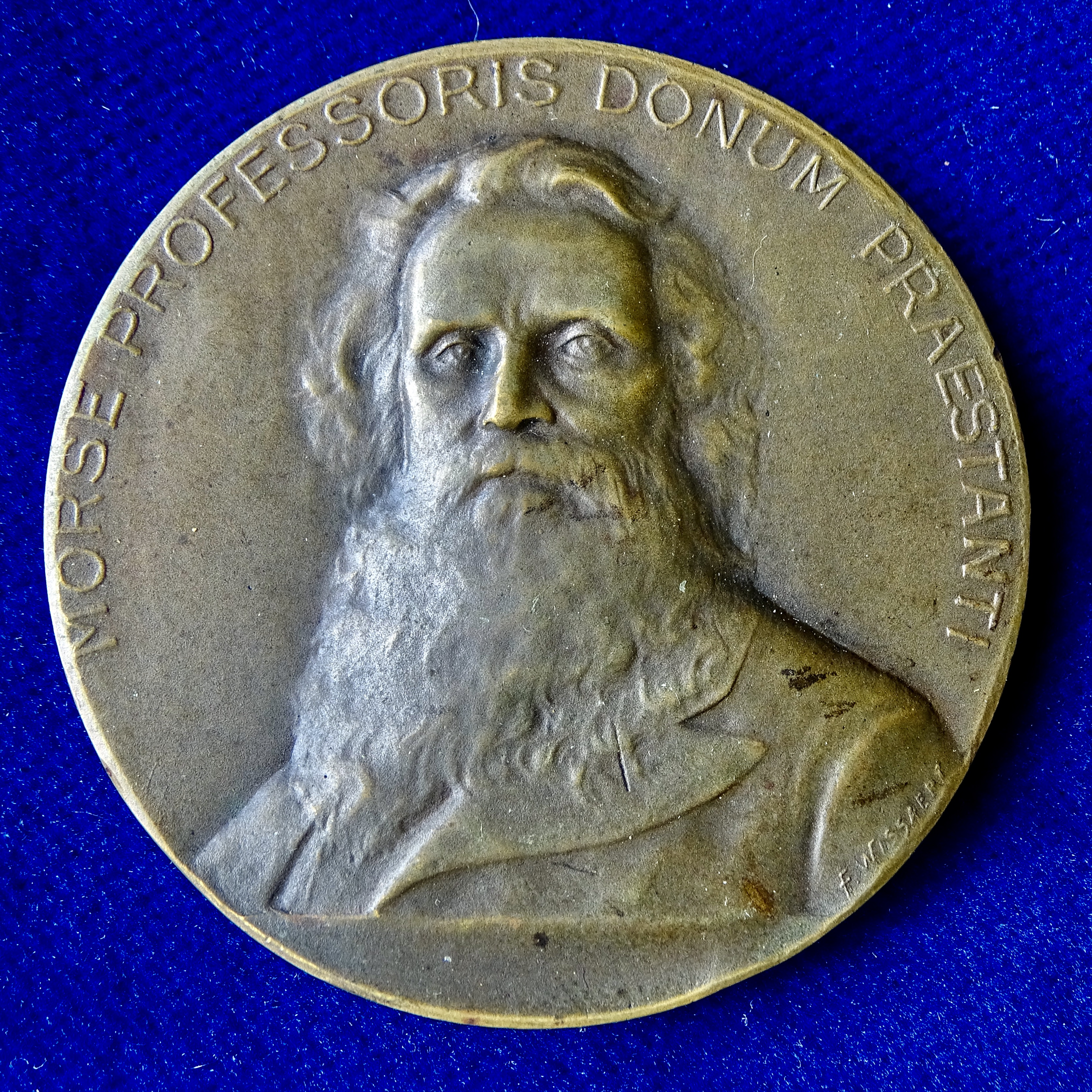
New York University Samuel F. B. Morse Art Nouveau medal by Paul Wissaert, obverse

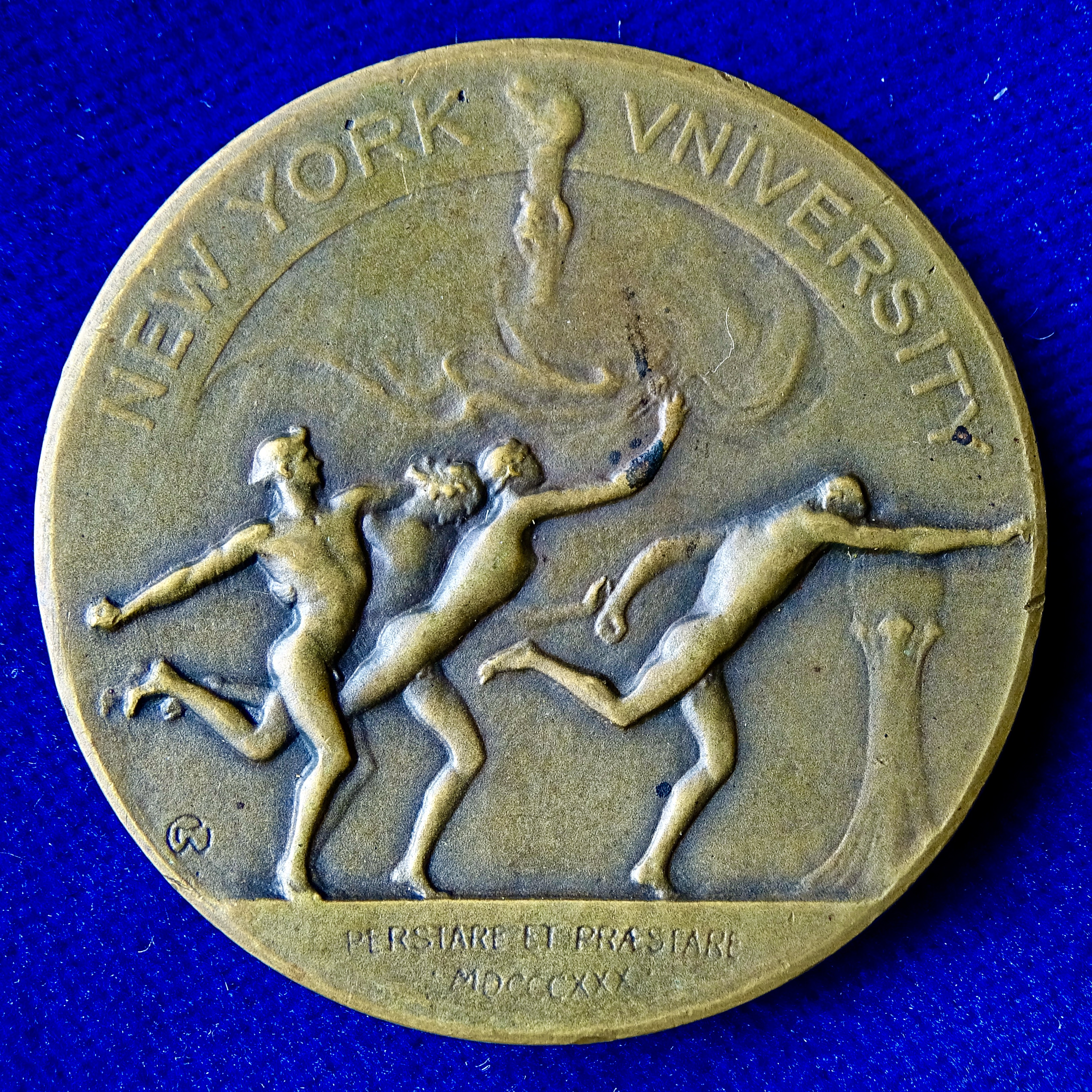
The reverse of this annual university award for physics students, provided by Samuel Morse in his will

Paul Wissaert (13 May 1885 – 5 July 1972) was a Belgian sculptor, and medallist. His work was part of the sculpture event in the art competition at the 1936 Summer Olympics.

His father was the medallist François Wissaert (1855 Brussels – 1929 Overijse)

Paul Wissaert has designed 1910 the New York University Samuel F. B. Morse Medal, that is awarded annually to the best physics undergraduate student. His signature is PW (monogram).
