= Nordic =

Nordic most commonly refers to:

- Nordic countries, the northern European countries of Denmark, Finland, Iceland, Norway and Sweden, and their North Atlantic territories
- Scandinavia, a cultural, historical and ethno-linguistic region in northern Europe
- a native of Northern Europe
- Nordic or North Germanic languages

Nordic may also refer to:

== Relating to a racial category ==
- Nordic race, a race group
- Nordicism, the belief that Northern Europeans constitute a "master race", a theory which influenced Adolf Hitler
- Nordic aliens, alleged extraterrestrials
- Nordic race, a race from the fictional The Elder Scrolls game series

== Places ==
- Nordic, Wyoming, a census-designated place in the United States

== Other uses ==
- Nordic (tug), a German emergency tow vessel
- The Nordic, seafood restaurant in Rhode Island
- THQ Nordic, a video game development company
- Nordic Semiconductor, often abbreviated as Nordic, a manufacturer of wireless communication semiconductors
- Nordic the Incurable, pen name of Finnish journalist Risto Hieta
- Ys X: Nordics, a 2023 video game

== See also ==
- Norse (disambiguation)
- Norden (disambiguation)
- North, a noun, adjective, or adverb indicating direction or geography
- Nordicity, a Canadian term used to designate "degree of northerliness"
- Nordisk (disambiguation)

== Flags ==
Nordic cross flag
