= Military history =

Study of war and its impact on societies, cultures, and economies

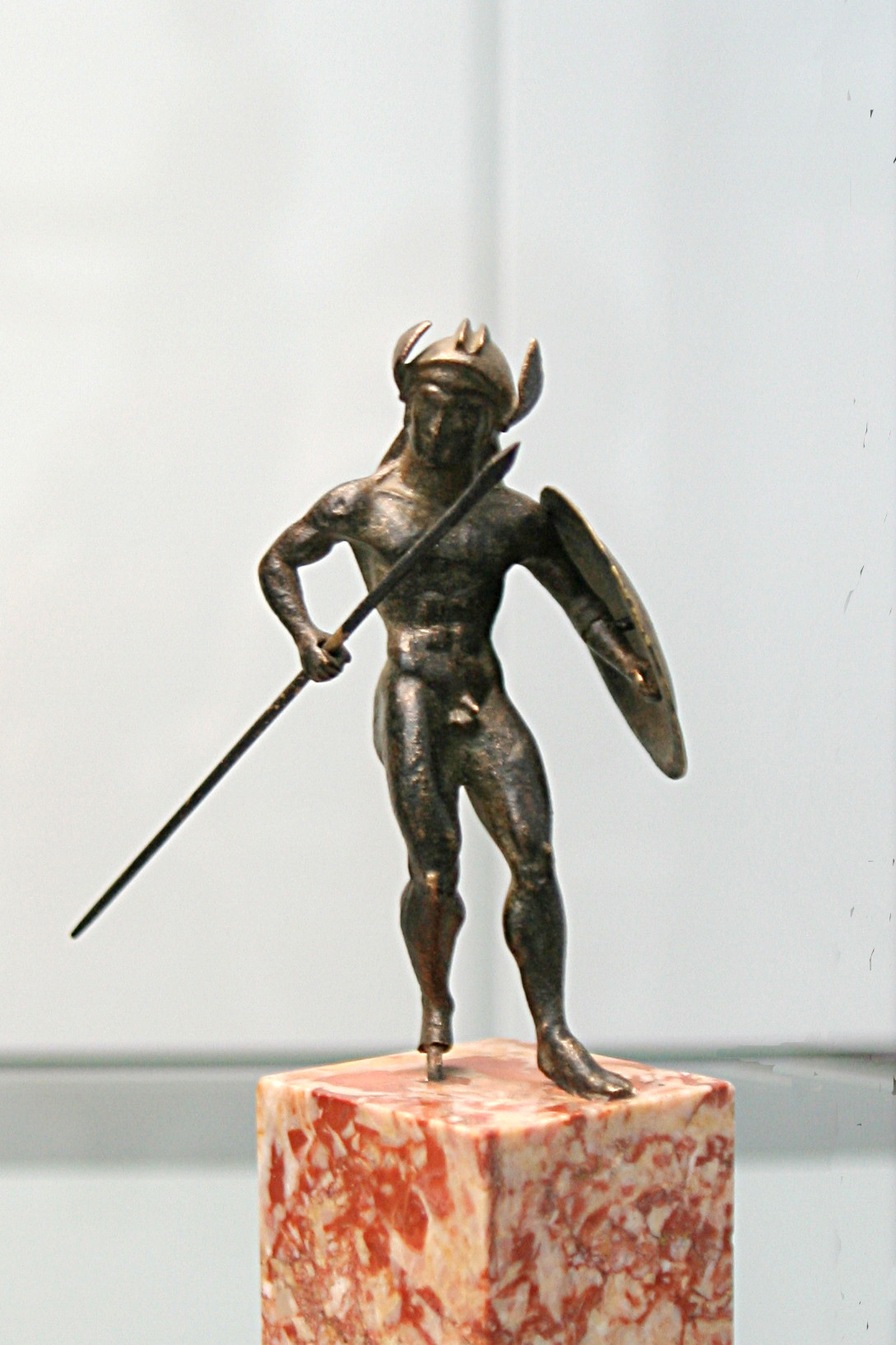
Infantry were the first military forces in history. This warrior statuette from Southern Italy illustrates the role of the military in historical societies, c.480 BC, Staatliche Antikensammlungen.

Military history is the study of armed conflict in the history of humanity, and its impact on the societies, cultures, and economies thereof, as well as the resulting changes to local and international relationships.

The essential subjects of military history study are the causes of war, the social and cultural foundations, military doctrine on each side, the logistics, leadership, technology, strategy, and tactics used, and how these changed over time. On the other hand, just war theory explores the moral dimensions of warfare and, to limit the destructive reality of war, seeks to establish a doctrine of military ethics.

Military history is taught at academies and service schools as an applied field because the military command aims to prevent past errors and enhance performance by training commanders to recognize historical parallels in battle and apply lessons from the past. When certifying military history instructors the Combat Studies Institute deemphasizes rote detail memorization and focuses on themes and context in relation to current and future conflict, using the motto "Past is Prologue."

The discipline of military history is dynamic, changing with developments in the subject area as much as in the societies and organisations that make use of it. The dynamic nature of the discipline of military history is largely due to the rapid change of military forces. The art and science of managing them, as well as the frenetic pace of technological development that has taken place during the period known as the Industrial Revolution, and more recently in the nuclear and information ages. An important recent concept is the Revolution in Military Affairs (RMA), which attempts to explain how emerging technologies, such as gunpowder, have shaped warfare. It highlights the short outbursts of rapid change followed by periods of relative stability.

== Popular versus academic military history ==
In the history profession across major countries, military history is an orphan, despite its enormous popularity with the general public. William H. McNeill points out:

This branch of our discipline flourishes in an intellectual ghetto. The 144 books in question [published in 1968-78] fall into two distinct classes: works aimed at a popular readership, written by journalists and men of letters outside academic circles, and professional work nearly always produced within the military establishment.... The study of military history in universities remains seriously underdeveloped. Indeed, lack of interest in and disdain for military history probably constitute one of the strangest prejudices of the profession.

In recent decades, university-level courses in military history have remained popular; often, they use films to humanize the combat experience. For example, Eugene P. A. Scleh, history professor at the University of Maine, has explored the advantages and problems of teaching a course on "Modern War and Its Images" entirely through films. Students said they found the documentaries more valuable than the dramas. However, military historians are frustrated by their marginal status in major history departments.

Although military history had traditionally focused on battles, campaigns and commanders, historians more and more examined warfare in relation to wider political, economic and social developments. Building on earlier approaches and the growth of social history, the new military history that emerged during the 1960s expanded the field to include the experiences of ordinary soldiers, military institutions and the social and cultural contexts and effects of warfare.

Academic historians concerned with military topics have their own scholarly organization, Society for Military History. Since 1937, it has published The Journal of Military History. Its four issues a year include scholarly articles, reviews of new books, and a bibliography of new publications and dissertations. The Society has 2,300 members, holds an annual convention, and awards prizes for the best scholarship.

== Historiography of military history ==
Historiography is the study of the history and method of the discipline of history or the study of a specialised topic. In this case, military history is used to obtain an accurate assessment of conflicts by drawing on all available sources. For this reason, military history is periodised, creating overlapping boundaries of study and analysis, in which descriptions of battles by leaders may be unreliable due to an inclination to minimize mention of failure and exaggerate success. Military historians use Historiographical analysis to provide an unbiased, contemporary view of records.

One military historian, Jeremy Black, outlined problems 21st-century military historians face as an inheritance of their predecessors: Eurocentricity, a technological bias, a focus on leading military powers and dominant military systems, the separation of land from sea and recently air conflicts, the focus on state-to-state conflict, and a lack of focus on political "tasking" in how forces are used.

If these challenges were not sufficient for military historians, the limits of method are further complicated by the lack of records, either destroyed or never recorded because of their value as a military secret. Scholars still do not know the exact nature of Greek fire, for instance. Researching Operation Enduring Freedom and Operation Iraqi Freedom, for example, has presented unique challenges for historians due to the destruction of records to protect classified military information, among other reasons. Historians use their knowledge of government regulation and military organization, and employ a targeted and systematic research strategy to piece together war histories. Despite these limits, wars are some of the most studied and detailed periods of human history.

Military historians have often compared the organizational, tactical, and strategic ideas, leadership, and national support of different nations' militaries.

In the early 1980s, historian Jeffrey Kimball studied how a historian's political stance on current events affects interpretive disagreements about the causes of 20th-century wars. He surveyed the ideological preferences of 109 active diplomatic historians in the United States and 54 active military historians. He finds that their current political views are moderately correlated with their historiographical interpretations. A clear position on the left-right continuum regarding capitalism was apparent in most cases. All groups agreed with the proposition, "historically, Americans have tended to view questions of their national security in terms of such extremes as good vs. evil." Though the Socialists were split, the other groups agreed that "miscalculation and/or misunderstanding of the situation" had caused U.S. interventionism." Kimball reports that:

Of historians in the field of diplomatic history, 7% are Socialist, 19% are Other, 53% are Liberal, 11% are None, and 10% Conservative. Of military historians, 0% are Socialist, 8% are Other, 35% are Liberal, 18% are None, and 40% are Conservative.

=== Online resources ===
People interested in military history from all periods and subtopics are increasingly turning to the Internet for many more resources than are typically available in nearby libraries. Since 1993, one of the most popular sites, with over 4000 members (subscriptions are free), has been H-WAR, sponsored by the H-Net network based at Michigan State University. H-War has six coeditors and an academic advisory board that sets policy. It sponsors daily moderated discussions of current topics, announcements of new publications and conferences, and reports on developments at conferences. The H-Net family of lists has sponsored and published over 46,000 scholarly book reviews, thousands of which deal with books in military history broadly conceived. Wikipedia itself has a very wide coverage of military history, with over 180,000 articles. Its editors sponsor Wikipedia:WikiProject Military history and encourage readers to join.

=== Military and war museums ===
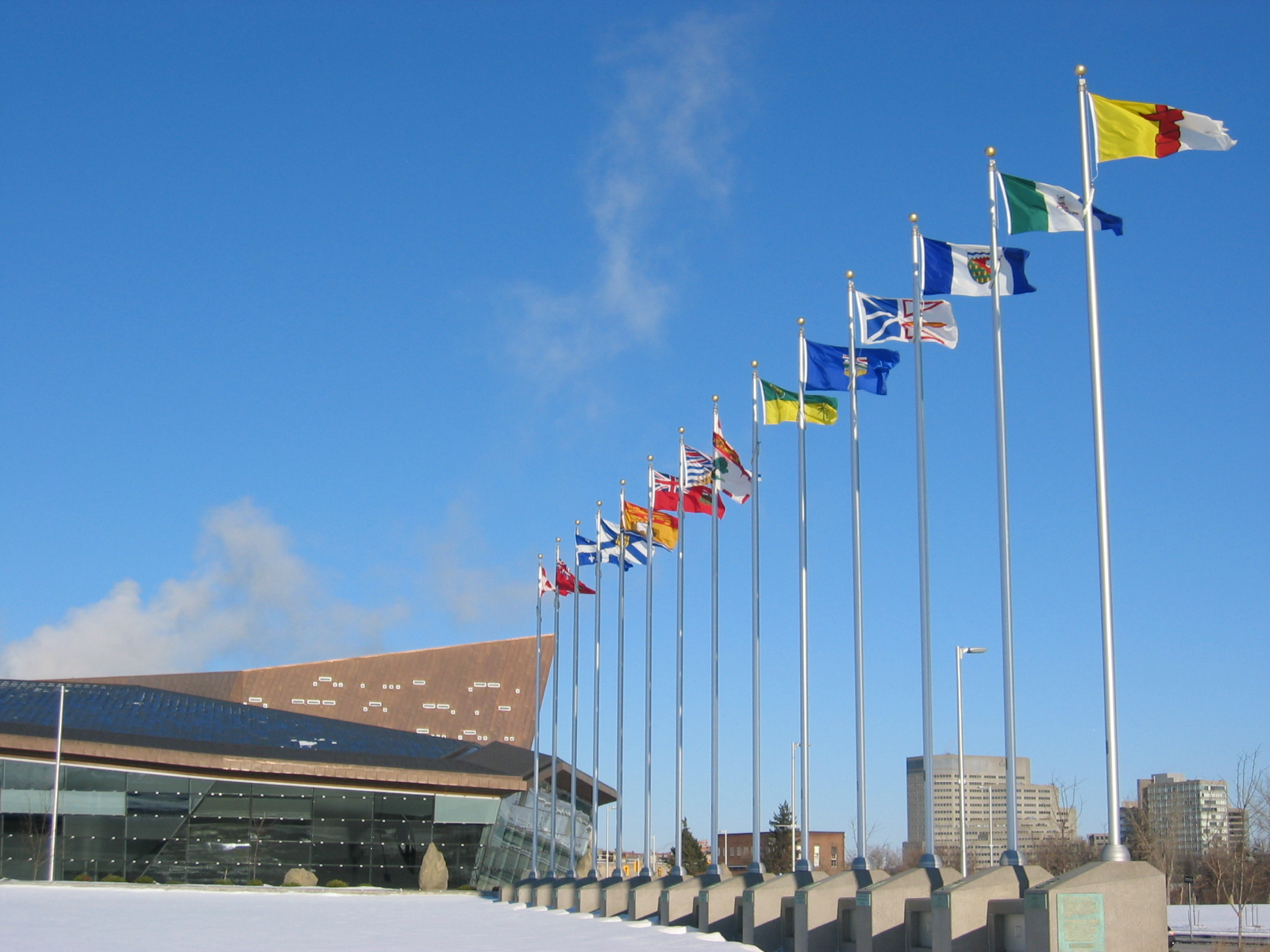
The Canadian War Museum.

Military museums specialize in military history; they are often organized from a national point of view, where a museum in a particular country will have displays organized around conflicts in which that country has participated. They typically take a broad view of warfare's role in the nation's history. They typically include displays of weapons and other military equipment, uniforms, wartime propaganda, and exhibits on civilian life during wartime, and decorations, among others. Some military museums specialize in a particular subject, such as the Imperial War Museum Duxford for military aircraft, the Deutsches Panzermuseum for tanks, the Lange Max Museum for the Western Front (World War I), the International Spy Museum for espionage, The National World War I Museum for World War I, and the "D-Day Paratroopers Historical Center" (Normandy) for WWII airborne, while others, like the Canadian War Museum and the Musée de l'Armée, are more general. For the Italian alpine wall, one can find the most popular bunker museum in the small museum n8bunker at Olang / Kronplatz in the heart of the Dolomites of South Tyrol. The U.S. Army and the state National Guards operate 98 military history museums across the United States and three abroad.

Curators debate how, or whether, to achieve the goal of providing diverse representations of war, including both positive and negative aspects of warfare. War is seldom presented as a good thing, but soldiers are heavily praised. David Lowenthal has observed that in today's museums, "nothing seems too horrendous to commemorate". Yet as Andrew Whitmarsh notes, "museums frequently portray a sanitised version of warfare." The actual bomber that dropped the atomic bomb on Japan became the focus of an angry national controversy with veterans attacking curators and historians when the Smithsonian Institution planned to put its fuselage on public display in 1995. The uproar led to the exhibit's cancellation.

== Early historians ==
The documentation of military history begins with the confrontation between Upper and Lower Egypt c. 3150 BC and Sumer (current Iraq) and Elam (current Iran) c. 2700 BC near the modern Basra. The Egyptian military scribe Tjaneni recorded the Battle of Megiddo (15th century BC), which is accepted as the first battle in relatively reliable detail. Military details are abundant in heroic epics, such as the Epic of Gilgamesh, Fall of Jericho and Conquest of Canaan, Trojan War in Homer's Iliad, and Mahabharata (though their historicity has been challenged). More credible records of the Israelite military history from the conquest of Canaan to the defeats by the Assyrian and Babylonian Empires are in the Biblical historical books following the Book of Joshua.

Next were The Histories by Herodotus (484–425 BC) who is often called the "father of history", and the History of the Peloponnesian War by Thucydides. Despite being an Athenian, Thucydides' impartiality enabled him to use his exile to study the war from multiple perspectives by carefully examining documents and interviewing eyewitnesses. An approach centered on the analysis of a leader was taken by Xenophon (430–355 BC) in Anabasis, recording the expedition of Cyrus the Younger into Anatolia. And Anabasis of Alexander described the expedition in the reverse direction. Greek historians of the 2nd century BC, such as Polybius, and later Roman historians, such as Sallust, Livy, Appian and Cassius Dio, wrote about wars of the rise of Rome to the primacy over the Mediterranean. The memoirs of the Roman Julius Caesar (100–44 BC) enable a comparative approach for campaigns such as Commentarii de Bello Gallico and Commentarii de Bello Civili.

East of the Mediterranean world, Arthashastra in India and The Art of War, The Book of Lord Shang, and less known but not less rich in military records Guanzi in China present strategic doctrines during the Axial Age. Records of the Grand Historian by Sima Qian and Han Fei Zi describe the Warring States of China, and the former also its culmination in the Qin wars of unification.

== Technological evolution ==
The nature of warfare never changes, only its superficial manifestations. Joshua and David, Hector and Achilles would recognize the combat that our soldiers and Marines have waged in the alleys of Somalia and Iraq. The uniforms evolve, bronze gives way to titanium, arrows may be replaced by laser-guided bombs, but the heart of the matter is still killing your enemies until any survivors surrender and do your will.

— Ralph Peters

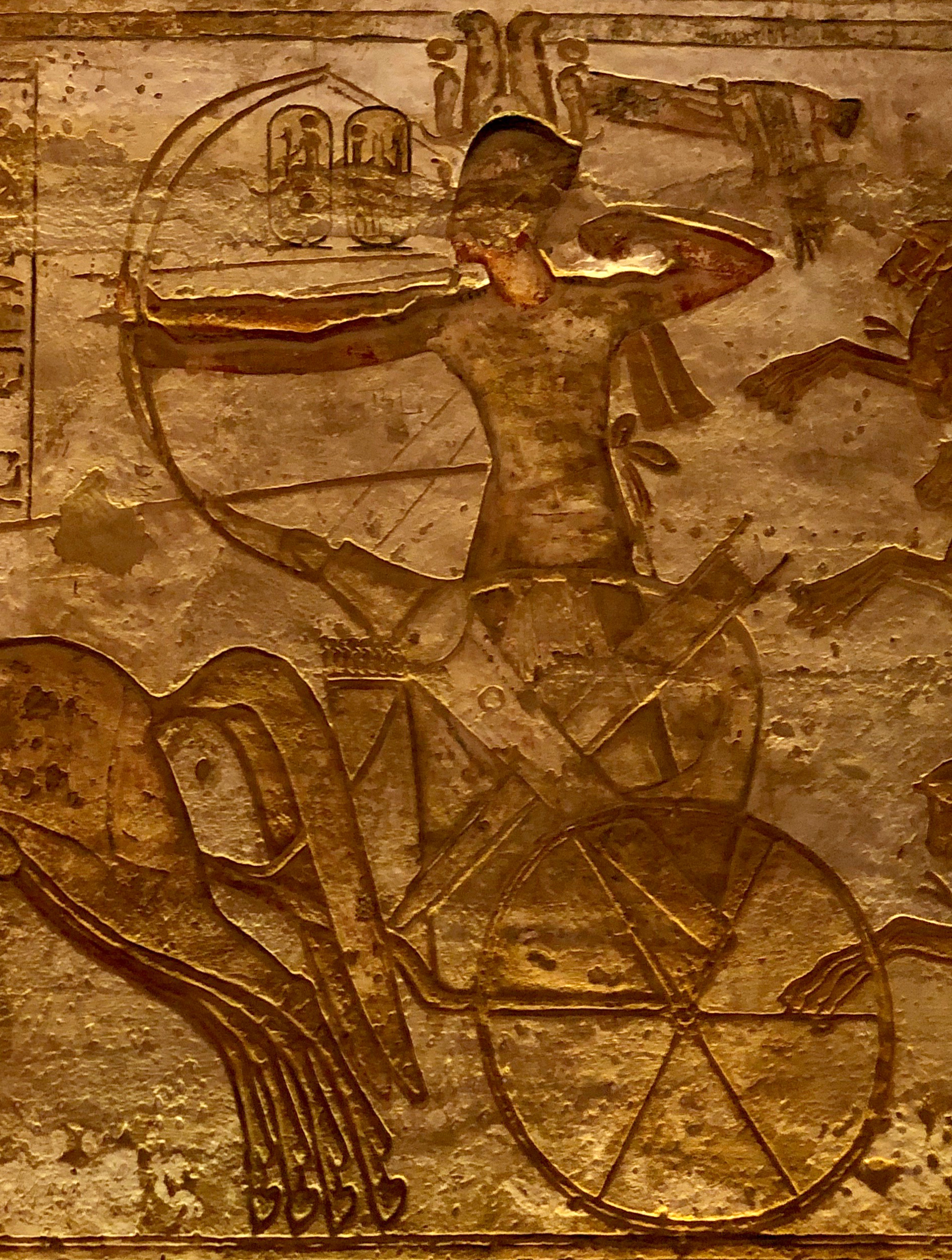
Relief of Ramses II located in Abu Simbel fighting at the Battle of Kadesh on a chariot

New weapons development can dramatically alter the face of war, the cost of warfare, the preparations, and the training of soldiers and leaders. A rule of thumb is that if your enemy has a potentially war-winning weapon, you have to either match it or neutralize it.

=== Ancient era ===
Chariots originated around 2000 BC. The chariot was an effective, fast weapon; while one man controlled its maneuvering, a second archer could shoot arrows at enemy soldiers. These became crucial to the maintenance of several governments, including the New Egyptian Kingdom, the Shang dynasty, and the nation-states of the early to middle Zhou dynasty.

Some of the military unit types and technologies developed in the ancient world are:

- Slinger
- Hoplite
- Auxiliaries
- Infantry
- Archery
- Chariots
- Cavalry

For settled agrarian civilizations, the infantry became the core of military action. The infantry started as opposing armed groups of soldiers under commanders. The Greeks and early Romans used rigid, heavily armed phalanxes. The Macedonians and Hellenistic states would adopt phalanx formations with sarissa pikemen. The Romans would later adopt more flexible maniples from their neighbors, which made them extremely successful in battle. The kingdoms of the Warring States in East Asia also adopted infantry combat, marking a transition away from chariot warfare of centuries earlier.

Archers were a major component of many ancient armies, notably those of the Persians, Scythians, Egyptians, Nubians, Indians, Chinese, Koreans, and Japanese.

Cavalry became an important tool. In the Sicilian Expedition, led by Athens in an attempt to subdue Syracuse, the well-trained Syracusan cavalry became crucial to the success of the Syracusans. Macedonian Alexander the Great effectively deployed his cavalry forces to secure victories. In battles such as the Battle of Cannae of the Second Punic War, and the Battle of Carrhae of the Roman-Persian Wars, the importance of the cavalry would be repeated.

There were also horse archers, who could shoot on horseback—the Parthians, Scythians, Mongols, and other various steppe people were especially fearsome with this tactic. By the 3rd–4th century AD, heavily armored cavalry became widely adopted by the Parthians, Sasanians, Byzantines, Eastern Han dynasty and Three Kingdoms, etc.

The early Indo-Iranians developed the use of chariots in warfare. The scythed chariot was later invented in India and soon adopted by the Persians.

War elephants were sometimes deployed in ancient warfare. They were first used in India and later adopted by the Persians. War elephants were also used in the Battle of the Hydaspes River, and by Hannibal in the Second Punic War against the Romans. One of the most important military transactions of the ancient world was Chandragupta Maurya's gift of 500 elephants to Seleucus I Nicator.

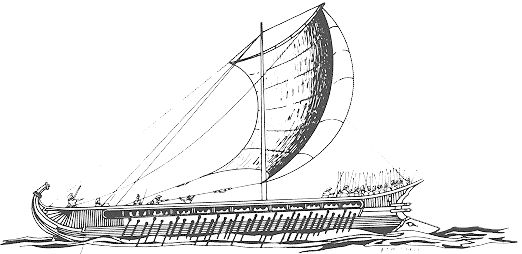
A Greek trireme

Naval warfare was often crucial to military success. Early navies used sailing ships without cannons; often, the goal was to ram the enemy ships and cause them to sink. There was human oar power, often using enslaved people, built up to ramming speed. Galleys were used in the 3rd millennium BC by the Cretans. The Greeks later advanced these ships.

In 1210 BC, the first recorded naval battle was fought between Suppiluliuma II, king of the Hittites, and Cyprus, which was defeated. In the Greco-Persian Wars, the navy became increasingly important.

Triremes were involved in more complicated sea-land operations. Themistocles helped to build up a stronger Greek navy, composed of 310 ships, and defeated the Persians at the Battle of Salamis, ending the Persian invasion of Greece.

In the First Punic War, the conflict between Carthage and Rome began with Carthage at an advantage due to its naval experience. A Roman fleet was built in 261 BC, with the addition of the corvus that allowed Roman soldiers to board enemy ships. The bridge would prove effective at the Battle of Mylae, resulting in a Roman victory.

The Norse, around the 4th century AD, started making longships using clinker technology, which were propelled by oars instead of paddles. Such were advanced for their time and could easily traverse both sea and rivers. By the 8th century, sails started being used due to the invention of woolen sails. Previously, wool was either too scarce, or the technology to use it for sail production didnt exist. Such warships were often decorated to look like dragons, and were apply called such. The 12th century AD Song dynasty invented ships with watertight bulkhead compartments, while the 2nd century BC Han dynasty invented rudders and sculled oars for their warships.

Fortifications are important in warfare. Early hill-forts were used to protect inhabitants in the Iron Age. They were primitive forts surrounded by water-filled ditches. Forts were then built from mud bricks, stone, wood, and other available materials. Romans used rectangular fortresses built out of wood and stone. As long as there have been fortifications, there have been contraptions to breach them, dating back to the Romans and earlier. Siege warfare is often necessary to capture forts.

=== Middle-ages ===
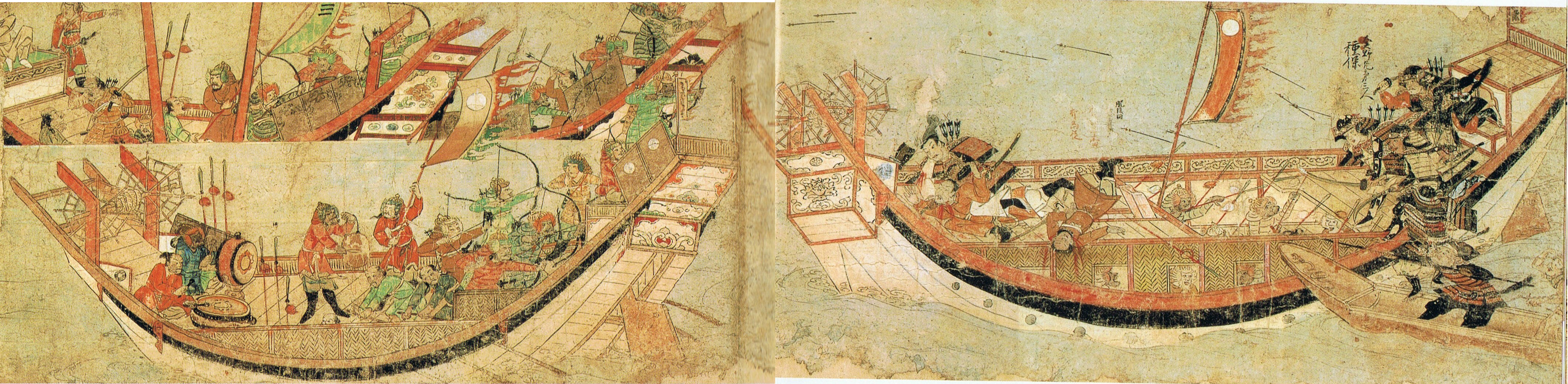
Japanese samurai boarding Mongol ships in 1281

Some of the military unit types and technologies which were used in the medieval period are:

- Artillery
- Cataphract
- Condottieri
- Fyrd
- Rashidun
- Mobile guard
- Mamluk
- Janissary
- Knight (see also: Chivalry)
- Crossbow
- Pikeman
- Samurai
- Sipahi
- Trebuchet

Bows and arrows were often used by combatants. Egyptians shot arrows from chariots effectively. The crossbow was developed around 500 BC in China and was widely used in the Middle Ages. The English/Welsh longbow from the 12th century also became important in the Middle Ages. It helped give the English a large early advantage in the Hundred Years' War, even though they were eventually defeated. The Battle of Crécy and the Battle of Agincourt are excellent examples of how to destroy an enemy using a longbow. It dominated battlefields for over a century.

=== Gunpowder ===
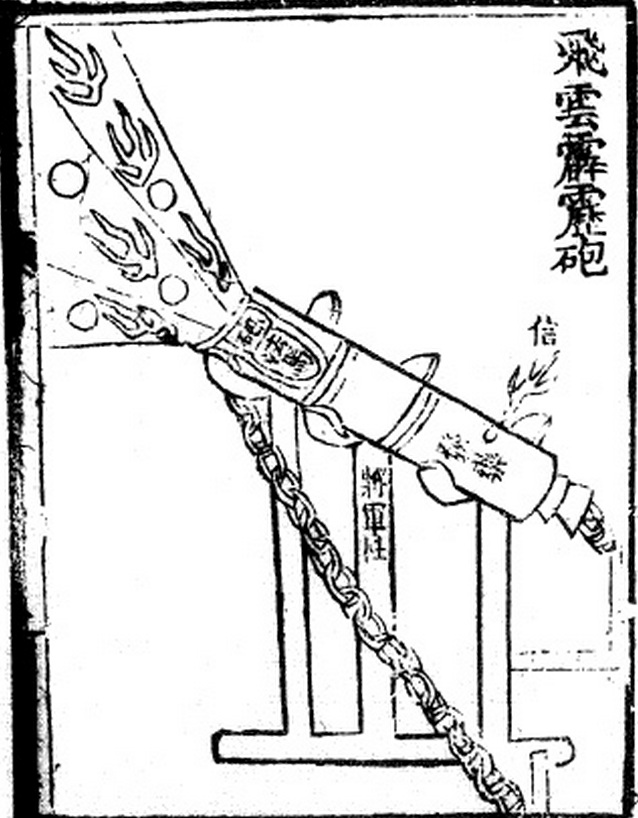
Illustration of an "eruptor", a proto-cannon, capable of firing cast-iron bombs filled with gunpowder, from the 14th century Ming dynasty book Huolongjing

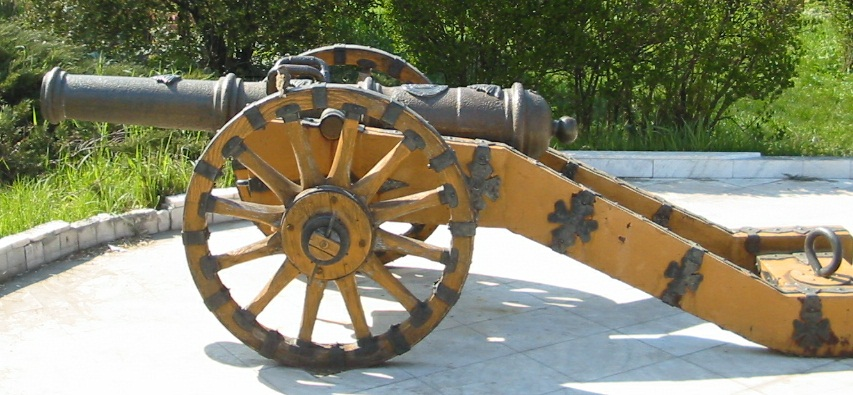
A small English Civil War-era cannon

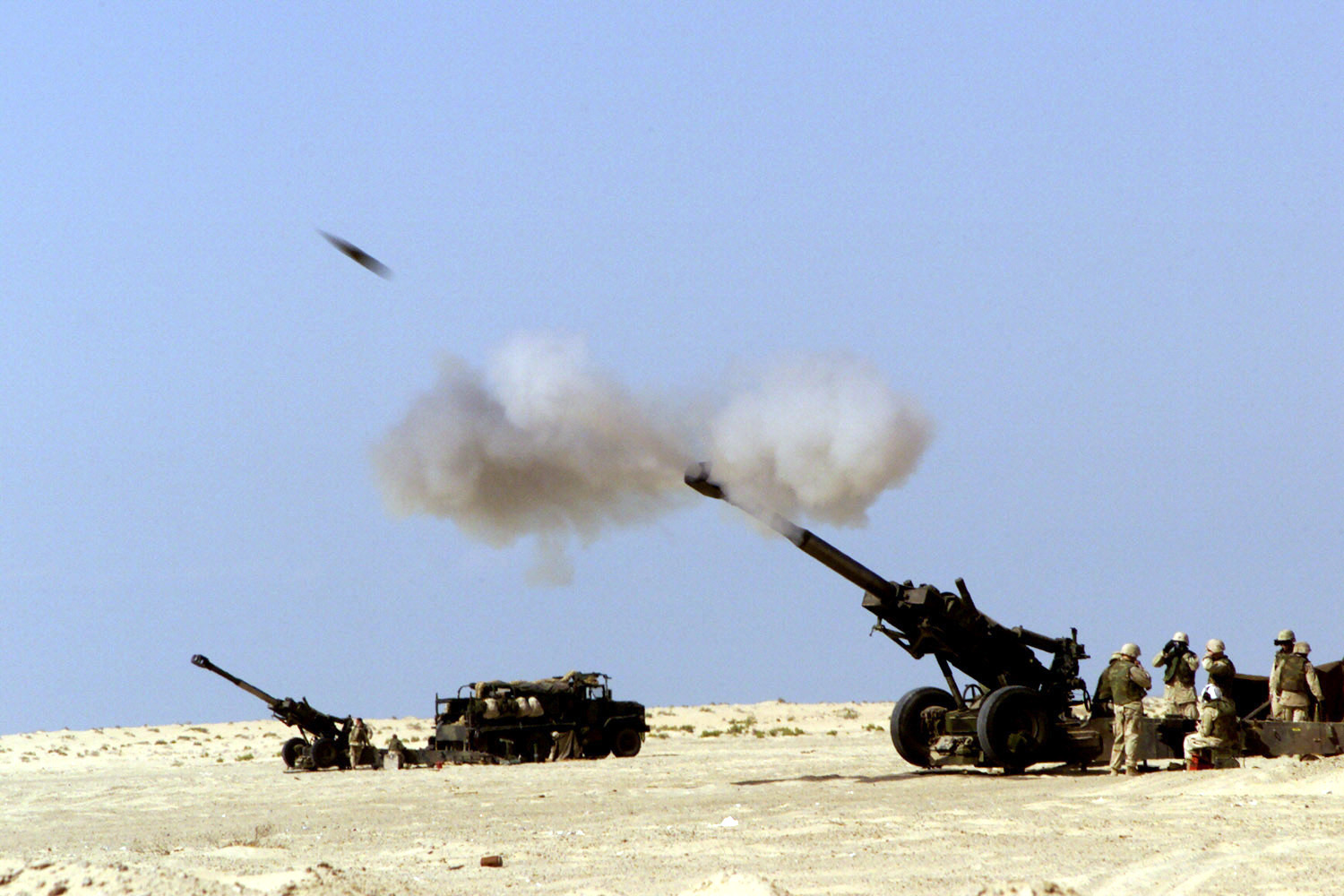
A 155 mm M198 howitzer firing a shell

There is evidence that gunpowder evolved slowly from formulations by Chinese alchemists as early as the 4th century, at first as experiments on life force and metal transmutation, and later as pyrotechnics and incendiaries. By the 10th century, the developments in gunpowder led to many new weapons that were improved over time. The Chinese used incendiary devices based on this in siege warfare against the Mongols starting in the mid-13th century. "Pots with wicks of flax or cotton were used, containing a combination of sulfur, saltpeter (potassium nitrate), aconitine, oil, resin, ground charcoal and wax." Joseph Needham argued the Chinese were able to destroy buildings and walls using such devices. Such experimentation was not present in Western Europe, where the combination of saltpeter, sulfur, and charcoal was used exclusively for explosives and as a propellant in firearms. What the Chinese often referred to as the "fire drug" arrived in Europe, fully fleshed out, as gunpowder.

Cannons were first used in Europe in the early 14th century, and played a vital role in the Hundred Years' War. The first cannons were welded metal cylinders, and the first cannonballs were made of stone. By 1346, at the Battle of Crécy, the cannon had been used; at the Battle of Agincourt they would be used again.

The first infantry firearms, from fire lances to hand cannons, were held in one hand, while the explosive charge was ignited by a lit match or hot coal held in the other hand. In the mid-15th century, the matchlock came, allowing the gun to be aimed and fired while held steady with both hands, as used in the arquebus. Around 1500, complex spark-producing firing mechanisms replaced the lit match, beginning with the wheel lock, snaplock, and snaphance. The flintlock mechanism, simple and reliable, followed and became standard with the musket by the early 17th century.

At the beginning of the 16th century, the first European fire ships were used. Ships were filled with flammable materials, set on fire, and sent to enemy lines. This tactic was successfully used by Francis Drake to scatter the Spanish Armada at the Battle of Gravelines, and would later be used by the Chinese, Russians, Greeks, and several other countries in naval battles.

Naval mines were invented in the 17th century, though they were not used in great numbers until the American Civil War. They were used heavily in the First and Second World Wars. Air-deployed naval mines were used to mine the North Vietnamese port of Haiphong during the Vietnam War. The Iraqi Navy of Saddam Hussein used naval mines extensively during the Tanker War, as part of the Iran–Iraq War.

The first navigable submarine was built in 1624 by Cornelius Drebbel; it could cruise at a depth of 15 feet (5 m). However, the first military submarine was constructed in 1885 by Isaac Peral.

The Turtle was developed by David Bushnell during the American Revolution. Robert Fulton then improved the submarine design by creating the Nautilus.

The Howitzer, a type of field artillery, was developed in the 17th century to fire high-trajectory explosive shells at targets that flat-trajectory projectiles could not reach.

Organizational changes that improved training and intercommunication made the concept of combined arms possible, allowing the coordinated use of infantry, cavalry, and artillery.

Bayonets also became widely used by infantry soldiers. Bayonet is named after Bayonne, France where it was first manufactured in the 16th century. It is often used in infantry charges to fight in hand-to-hand combat. General Jean Martinet introduced the bayonet to the French army. They were used extensively in the American Civil War and continued to be used in modern wars such as the Invasion of Iraq.

Balloons were first used in warfare at the end of the 18th century. It was first introduced in Paris of 1783; the first balloon traveled over 5 miles (8 km). Previously, military scouts could only see from high points on the ground, or from the mast of a ship. Now they could be high in the sky, signalling to troops on the ground. This made it much more difficult for troop movements to go unobserved.

At the end of the 18th century, iron-cased artillery rockets were successfully used militarily in India against the British by Tipu Sultan of the Kingdom of Mysore during the Anglo-Mysore Wars. Rockets were generally inaccurate at that time, though William Hale, in 1844, was able to develop a better rocket. The new rocket no longer needed the rocket stick and had a higher accuracy.

In the 1860s, there was a series of advancements in rifles. The first repeating rifle was designed in 1860 by a company that was later acquired by the Winchester Repeating Arms Company, which produced new and improved versions. Springfield rifles arrived in the mid-19th century also. Machine guns arrived in the late 19th century. Automatic rifles and light machine guns first arrived at the beginning of the 20th century.

In the later part of the 19th century, the self-propelled torpedo was developed. The HNoMS Rap was the world's first torpedo boat.

=== Early guns and artillery ===
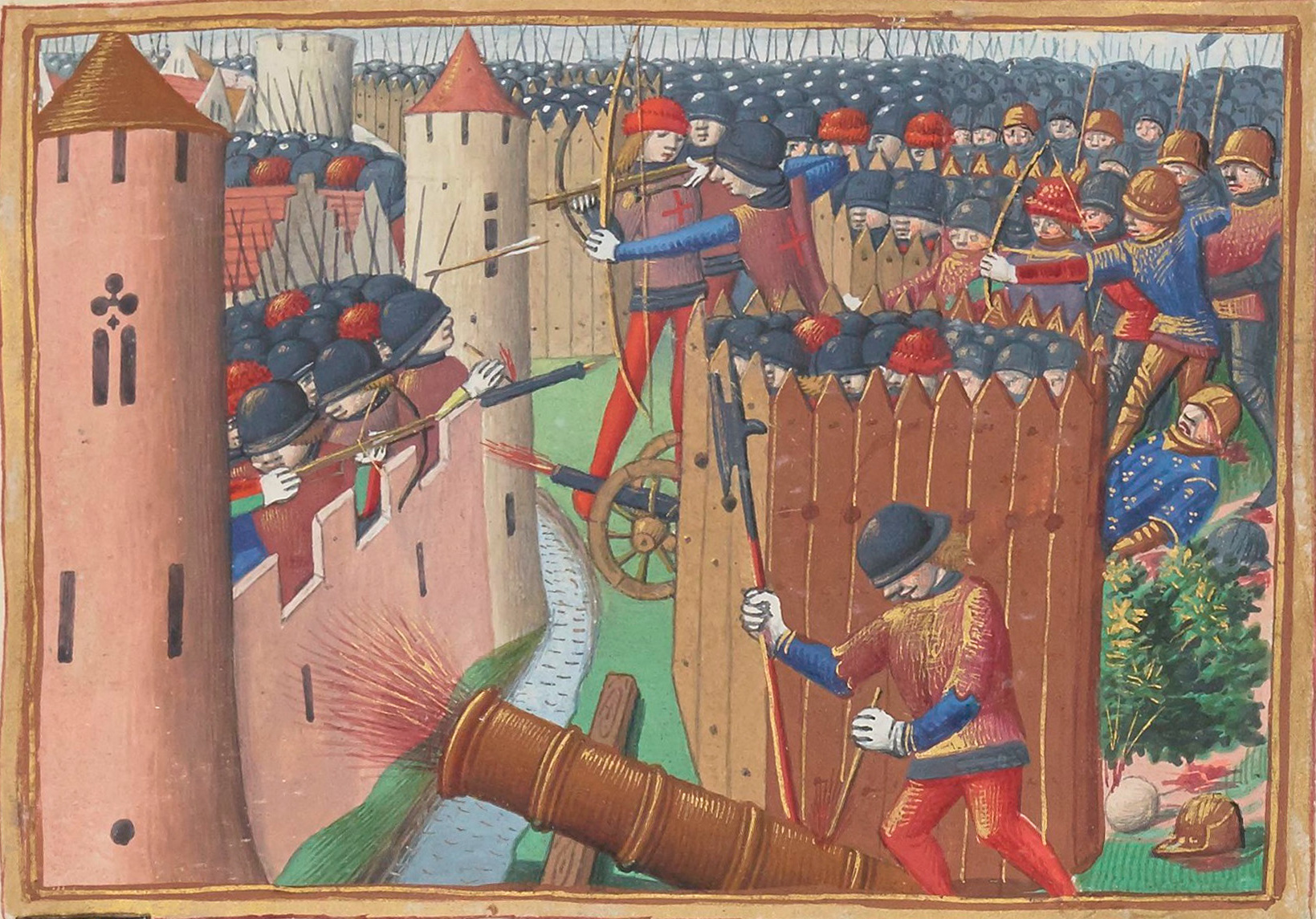
The first Western image of a battle with cannon: the Siege of Orléans in 1429

The fire lance, the predecessor of the gun, was invented in China between the tenth and eleventh centuries. The barrel was originally designed from bamboo shoots and later from metal. Joseph Needham notes "all the long preparations and tentative experiments were made in China, and everything came to Islam and the West fully fledged, whether it was the fire lance or the explosive bomb, the rocket or the metal-barrel handgun and bombard." By the 1320s, Europe had guns, but scholars state that the exact time and method of migration from China remains a mystery. Evidence of firearms is found in Iran and Central Asia in the late fourteenth century. It was not until roughly 1442 that guns were referenced in India. Reliable references to guns in Russia begin around 1382.

An illustration of a "pot-shaped gun" found in the Holkham Hall Milemete manuscript, dated to 1326, shows the earliest advent of firearms in European history. The illustration shows an arrow, set in the pot-shaped gun, pointed directly at a structure. Archaeological evidence of such "gun arrows" were discovered in Eltz Castle, "dated by relation to a historical event (a feud with the Archbishop of Trier in 1331–36 leading to a siege), seem to confirm again that this was at least one of the types of guns like the Milemete used in these very early examples."

According to Peter Fraser Purton, the best evidence of the earliest gun in Europe is the Loshult gun, dated to the fourteenth century. Discovered in 1861, the Loshult was made of bronze and measured 11.8 inches in length. A replica of the Loshult was created using similar gunpowder compounds and present-day materials to determine the weapon's effectiveness. The Gunpowder Research Group, which designed the recreation, found that at high elevations the Loshult could fire up to 1300 meters. Though inaccurate, missing targets further than 200 meters, the Loshult could fire a range of projectiles such as arrows and shot. It was determined that the Loshult could be effectively fired at ranks of soldiers and structures.

Written works from the Cabinet des titres of the Bibliothèque nationale de France provide evidence of canons in France in 1338. The works illustrate the use of canons aboard ships at Rouen at that time. "...an iron Fire-arm, which was provided with forty-eight bolts, made of iron and freather; also one pound of saltpetre and half a pound of sulphur to make the powder propel arrows."

Researchers have been unable to determine the sizes of these cannons and others from artifacts recovered. Sir Henry Brackenbury was able to surmise the approximate size of these cannons by comparing receipts for both the firearms and the corresponding amounts of gunpowder purchased. The receipts show a transaction for "25 Livres for 5 canons." Brackenbury was able to deduce, when comparing the costs of the cannons and the gunpowder apportioned, that each iron cannon weighed approximately 25 lbs, while the brass cannons weighed roughly 22 pounds.

Philip the Bold (1363–1404) is credited with creating the most effective artillery power in Europe in the late fourteenth century, effectively creating the Burgundian estate. Philip's development of a large artillery army made the small country a reputable force against larger empires such as England and France. Philip had achieved this by establishing a large scale artillery manufacturing economy in Burgundy. Philip used his new cache of artillery to help the French capture an English-held fortress of Odruik. The artillery used to take Odruik used cannonballs weighing about 450 pounds.

Large artillery was a major contributing factor to the fall of Constantinople at the hands of Mehmed the Conqueror (1432–1481). Having resigned his position as ruler due to youth and inexperience in 1446, Mehmed moved to the Ottoman capital of Manisa. After his father, Murad II died in 1451, Mehmed once again became Sultan. He turned his attention to claiming the Byzantine capital, Constantinople. Mehmed, like Philip, started mass-producing cannons by enticing artisans to his cause with money and freedom. For 55 days, Constantinople was bombarded with artillery fire, throwing cannonballs as large as 800 lbs at its walls. On 29 May 1453, Constantinople fell into Ottoman control.

=== Early firearm tactics ===
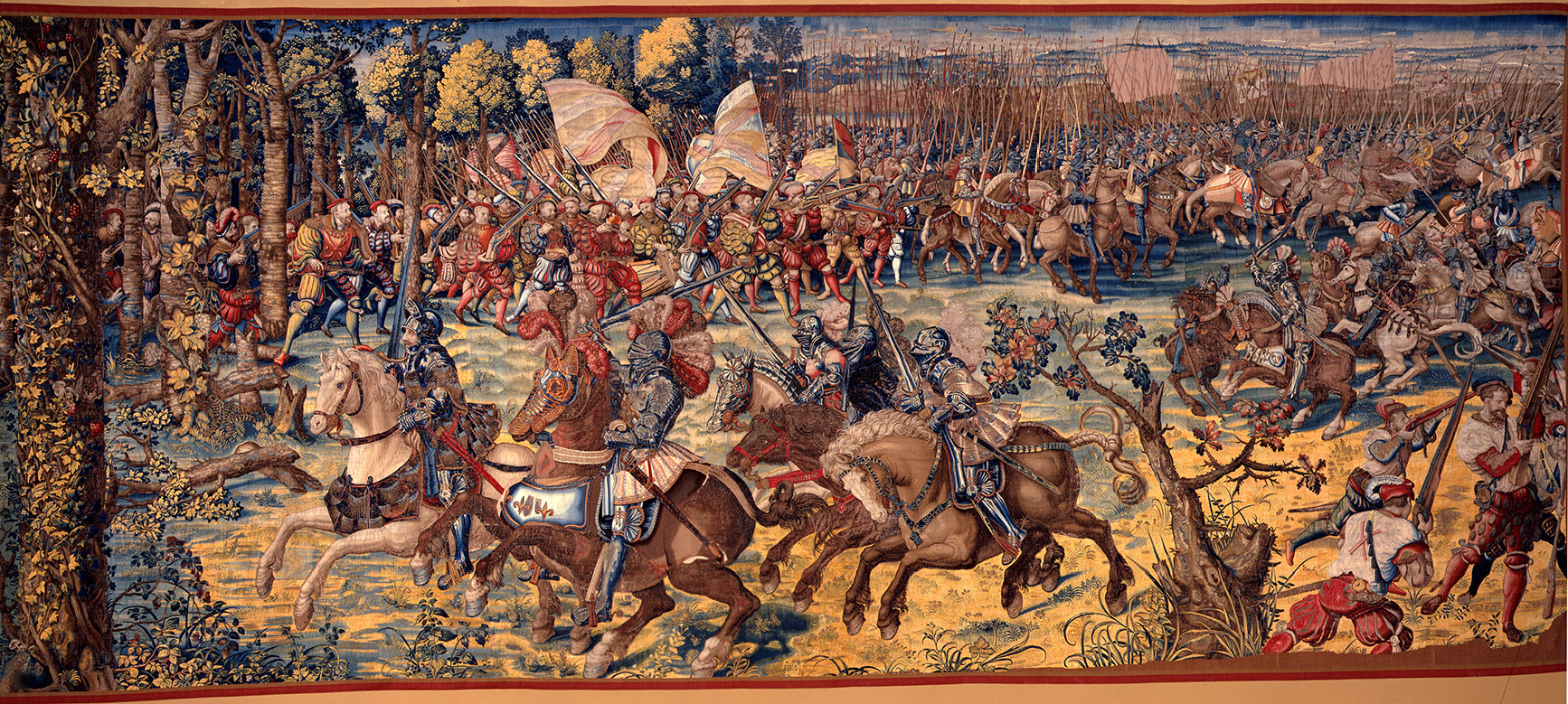
The Battle of Pavia in 1525. Heavy cavalry and Landsknecht mercenaries armed with arquebuses.

As guns and artillery became more advanced and prevalent, so too did the tactics by which they were implemented. According to Historian Michael Roberts, "...a military revolution began with the broad adoption of firearms and artillery by late sixteenth-century European armies." Infantry with firearms replaced cavalry. Empires adapted their strongholds to withstand artillery fire. Eventually, drilling strategies and battlefield tactics were adapted to the evolution in firearms use.

In Japan, at the same time in the sixteenth century, this military evolution was also taking hold. These changes included a universal adoption of firearms, tactical developments for effective use, logistical restructuring within the military itself, and "the emergence of centralized and political and institutional relationships indicative of the early modern order."

Tactically, beginning with Oda Nobunaga, the technique known as "volleying" or countermarch drills was implemented. Volley fire is an organized implementation of firearms, where infantry are structured in ranks. The ranks will alternate between loading and firing positions, allowing more consistent rates of fire and preventing enemies from taking over a position while members reload.

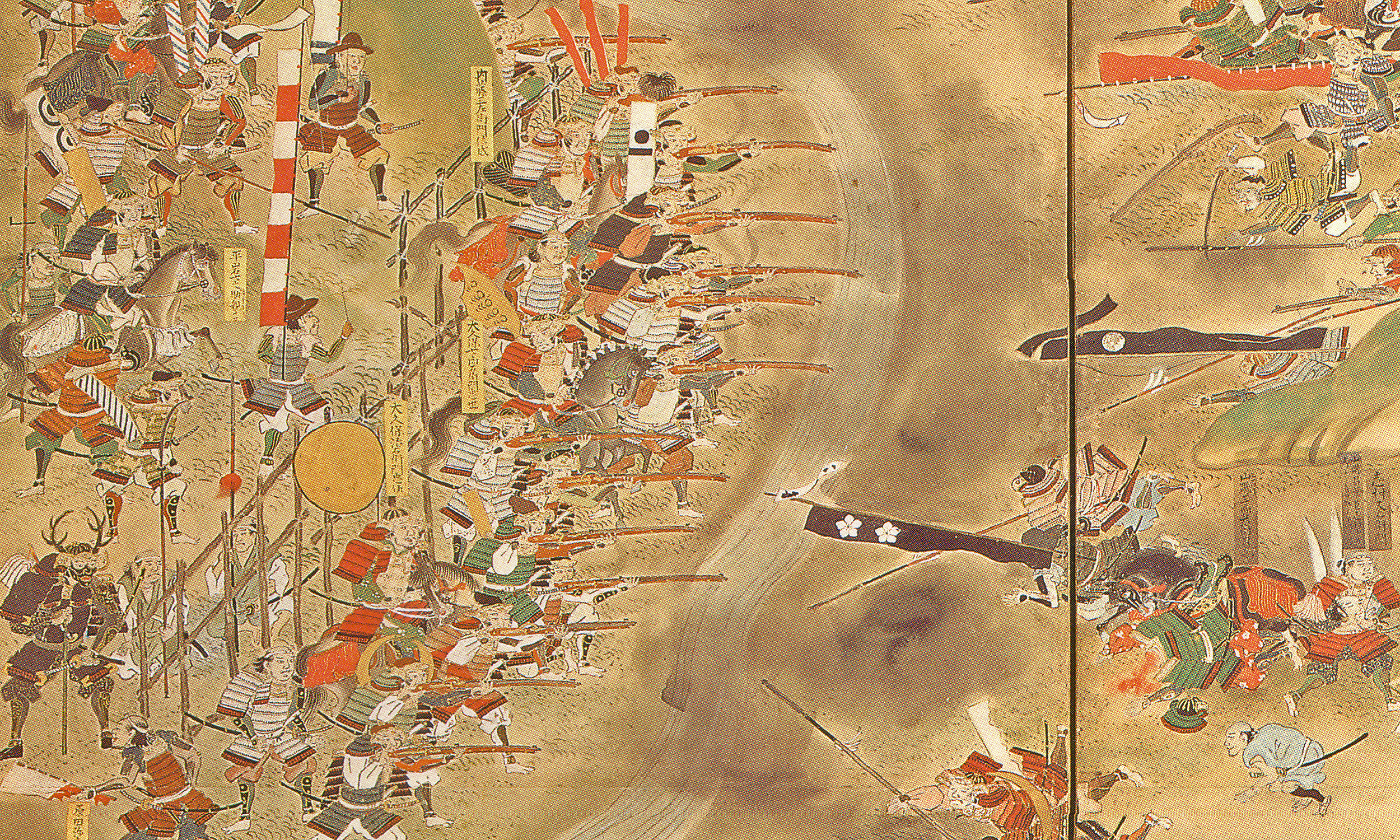
The Battle of Nagashino in 1575. Key to Oda's success during the battle was the deployment of 10,000 Ashigaru arquebusiers.

Historical evidence shows that Oda Nobunaga successfully implemented his volley technique in 1575, twenty years before evidence of such a technique appears in Europe. The first indications of the countermarch technique in Europe appeared in the mid-1590s with Lord William Louis of Nassau (1538–1574).

Korea also seemed to be adopting the volley technique earlier than even Japan. "Koreans seem to have employed some kind of volley principle with guns by 1447, when the Korean King Sejong the Great instructed his gunners to shoot their 'fire barrels' in squads of five, taking turns firing and loading."

This was on display during what Kenneth Swope called the First Great East Asian War, when Japan was trying to take control and subjugate Korea. Toyotomi Hideyoshi (1537–1598) made a failed invasion of Korea, which lasted six years, eventually pushed back by the Koreans with the aid of Ming China. Japan, using overwhelming firepower, had many early victories on the Korean peninsula. Though the Koreans had a similar workforce, "the curtain of arrows thrown up by defenders was wiped out by [Japanese] gunfire." After the Japanese were finally pushed back in 1598, sweeping military reforms took place in Korea, largely based on updating and implementing the volley technique with firearms.

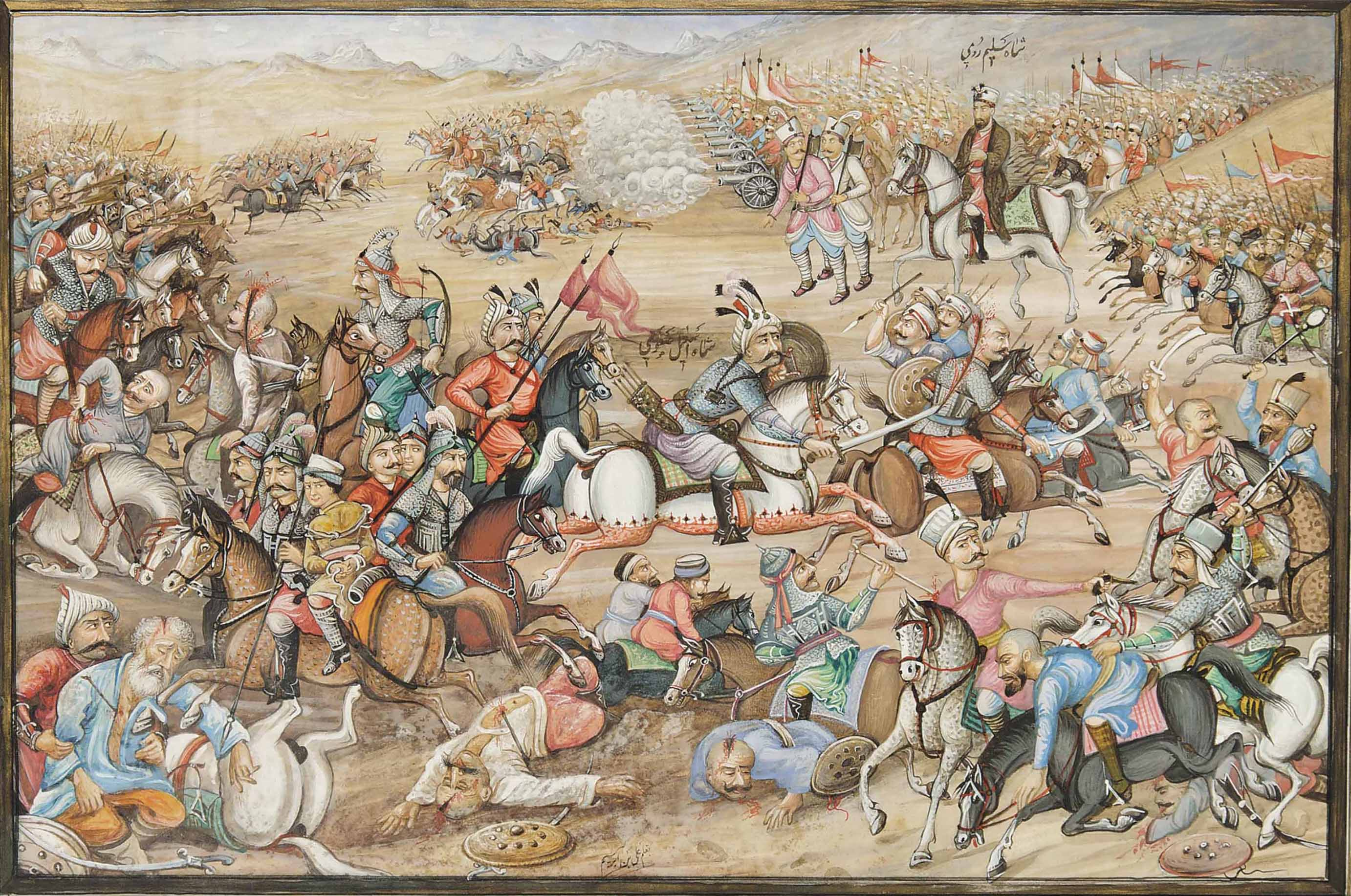
The advanced Ottoman weaponry (cannons and muskets wielded by janissaries) was the deciding factor of the Battle of Chaldiran.

It was Qi Jiguang, a Ming Chinese general, who provided the original treatise, disseminated to Koreans, that aided in this venture. In these manuals, Qi "...gave detailed instructions in the use of small group tactics, psychological warfare, and other 'modern' techniques." Qi emphasized repetitive drilling, dividing men into smaller groups, and separating the strong from the weak. Qi's ethos was one of synthesizing smaller groups, trained in various tactical formations, into larger companies, battalions, and armies. By doing this, they could "operate as eyes, hands, and feet..." aiding in overall unit cohesion.

=== Modern technologies ===
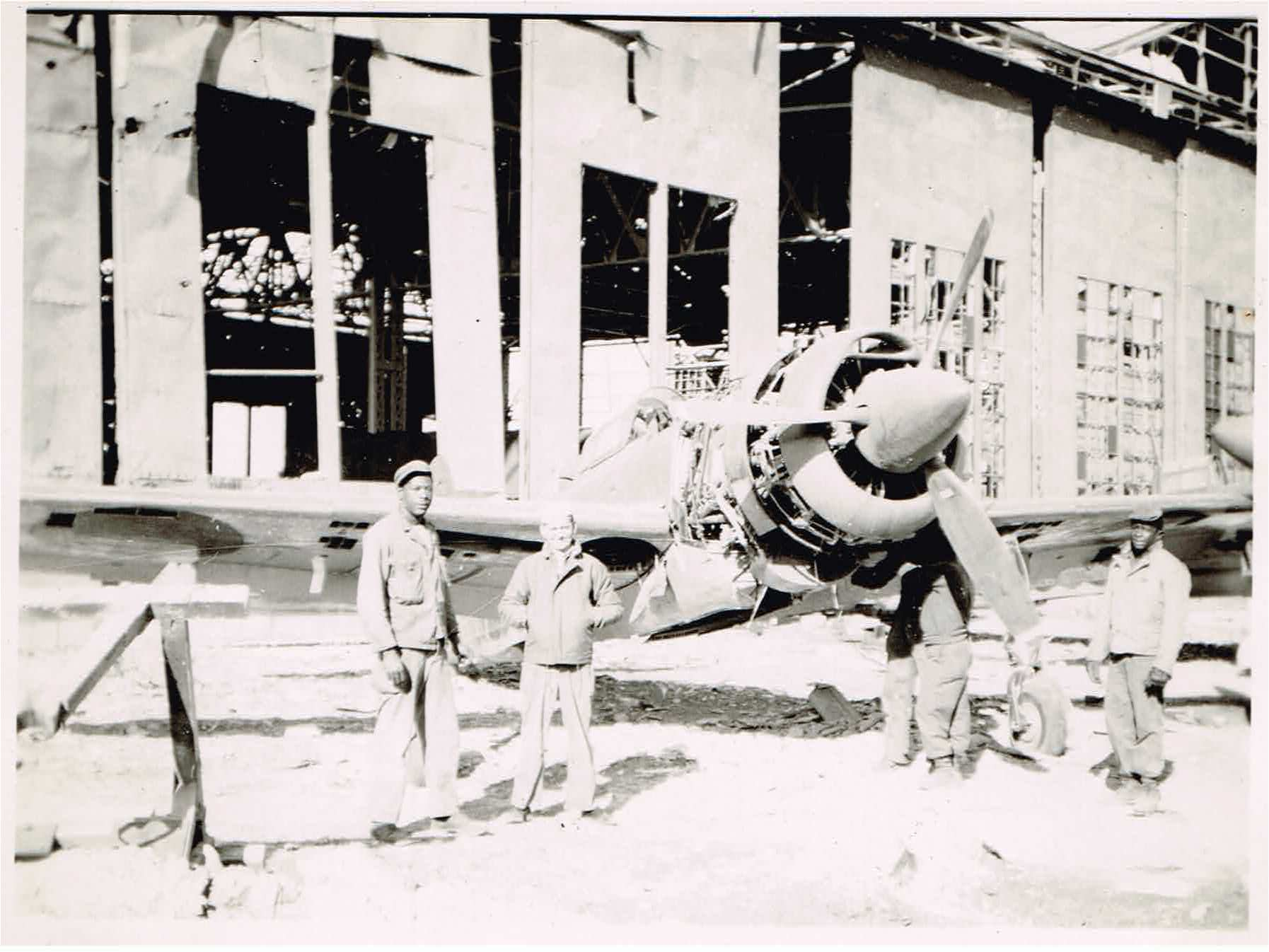
Yokosuka D4Y3, a Japanese Aircraft used during WWII

At the start of the World Wars, various nations had developed weapons that were a surprise to their adversaries, prompting a need to learn from this and adapt how to combat them. Flame throwers were first used in the First World War. The French were the first to introduce the armored car in 1902. Then in 1918, the British produced the first armored troop carrier. Many early tanks were proof-of-concept but impractical until further development. In World War I, the British and French held a crucial advantage due to their superiority in tanks; the Germans had only a few dozen A_{7}V tanks and 170 captured tanks. The British and the French each had several hundred. The French tanks included the 13 ton Schneider CA1, with a 75 mm gun, and the British had the Mark IV and Mark V tanks.

On 17 December 1903, the Wright Brothers performed the first controlled, powered, heavier-than-air flight; it went 39 meters (120 ft). In 1907, the first helicopter flew, but it was not practical for usage. Aviation became important during World War I, when several aces gained fame. In 1911, an aircraft took off from a warship for the first time. Landings on a cruiser were another matter. This led to the development of an aircraft carrier with a decent unobstructed flight deck.

Chemical warfare exploded into the public consciousness in World War I but may have been used in earlier wars without as much human attention. The Germans used gas-filled shells at the Battle of Bolimov in January 1915. These were not lethal, however. In April 1915, the Germans developed a highly lethal chlorine gas and used it to moderate effect at the Second Battle of Ypres. Gas masks were invented in a matter of weeks, and poison gas proved ineffective at winning battles. It was made illegal by all nations in the 1920s.

World War II spurred further technological advances. The role of aircraft expanded from primarily reconnaissance to strategic bombing and more. The worth of the aircraft carrier was proved in the battles between the United States and Japan, such as the Battle of Midway. Radar was independently invented by the Allies and Axis powers. It used radio waves to detect objects. Molotov cocktails were invented by General Franco in the Spanish Civil War, directing the Nationalists to use them against Soviet tanks in the assault on Toledo. The atomic bomb was developed by the Manhattan Project and dropped on Hiroshima and Nagasaki in 1945, quickly and controversially ending World War II.

During the Cold War, the main powers engaged in a nuclear arms race, which comprised the making of atomic bombs, hydrogen bombs, and more advanced nuclear bombs. In the space race, both nations attempted to launch human beings into space, to the moon, and send satellites. Other technological advances were centered on intelligence (such as the spy satellite) and missiles (including ballistic missiles and cruise missiles). The nuclear submarine was invented in 1955. This meant submarines no longer needed to surface as often, and could run more quietly. They evolved into underwater missile platforms and completed what became called nuclear triad.

== Periods of military history ==
=== Prehistoric warfare ===
Prehistoric warfare refers to war that occurred between societies without recorded history. The Tollense valley battlefield is the oldest evidence of a large-scale battle in Europe. More than 4,000 warriors fought in a battle on the site in the 13th century BC.

=== Ancient warfare ===
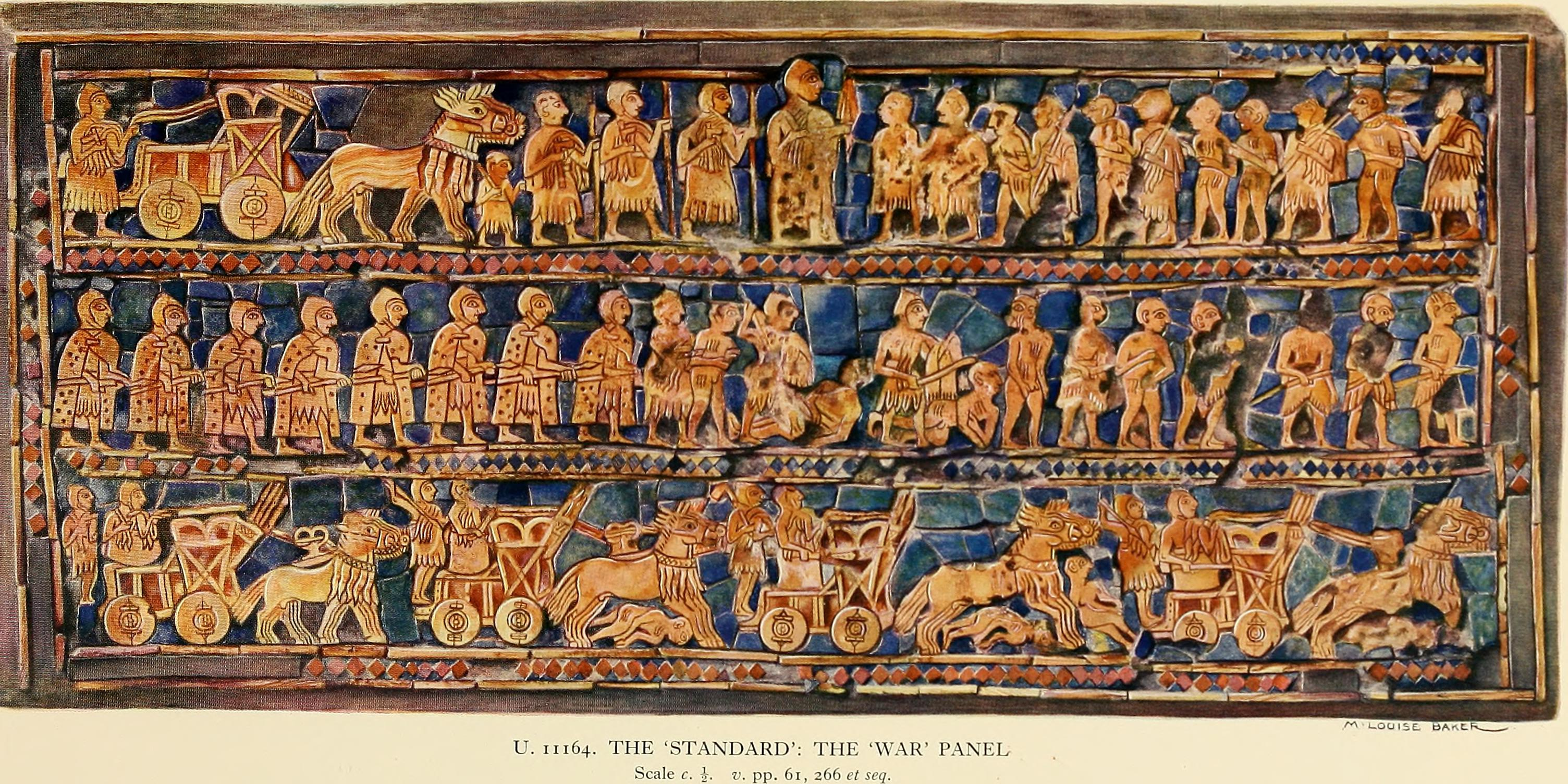
The Standard of Ur with depictions of war and peace, from the Sumerian city-state of Ur, c. 2600 BC

Much of what we know of ancient history is the history of militaries: their conquests, their movements, and their technological innovations. There are many reasons for this. Kingdoms and empires, the central units of control in the ancient world, could only be maintained through military force. Due to limited agricultural ability, there were relatively few areas that could support large communities, and fighting was common.

The Umma–Lagash war was one of the earliest recorded wars, fought between the Sumerian city-states of Lagash and Umma. The border conflict over the fertile Guedena region lasted for several generations.

Weapons and armor, designed to be sturdy, tended to last longer than other artifacts. Thus, many of the recovered artifacts tend to fall into this category, as they are more likely to survive. Weapons and armor were also mass-produced to a scale that makes them quite plentiful throughout history, and thus more likely to be found in archaeological digs.

Such items were also considered signs of prosperity or virtue and were thus likely to be placed in tombs and monuments to prominent warriors. And when it existed, writing was often used by kings to boast of military conquests or victories.

Writing, when used by the common person, also tended to record such events, as major battles and conquests were events many would have considered worthy of recording, either in an epic such as the Homeric writings about the Trojan War or even in personal writings. Indeed, the earliest stories center on warfare, as war was both a common and dramatic aspect of life; the witnessing of a major battle involving many thousands of soldiers would be quite a spectacle, even today, and thus considered worthy both of being recorded in song and art, but also in realistic histories, as well as being a central element in a fictional work.

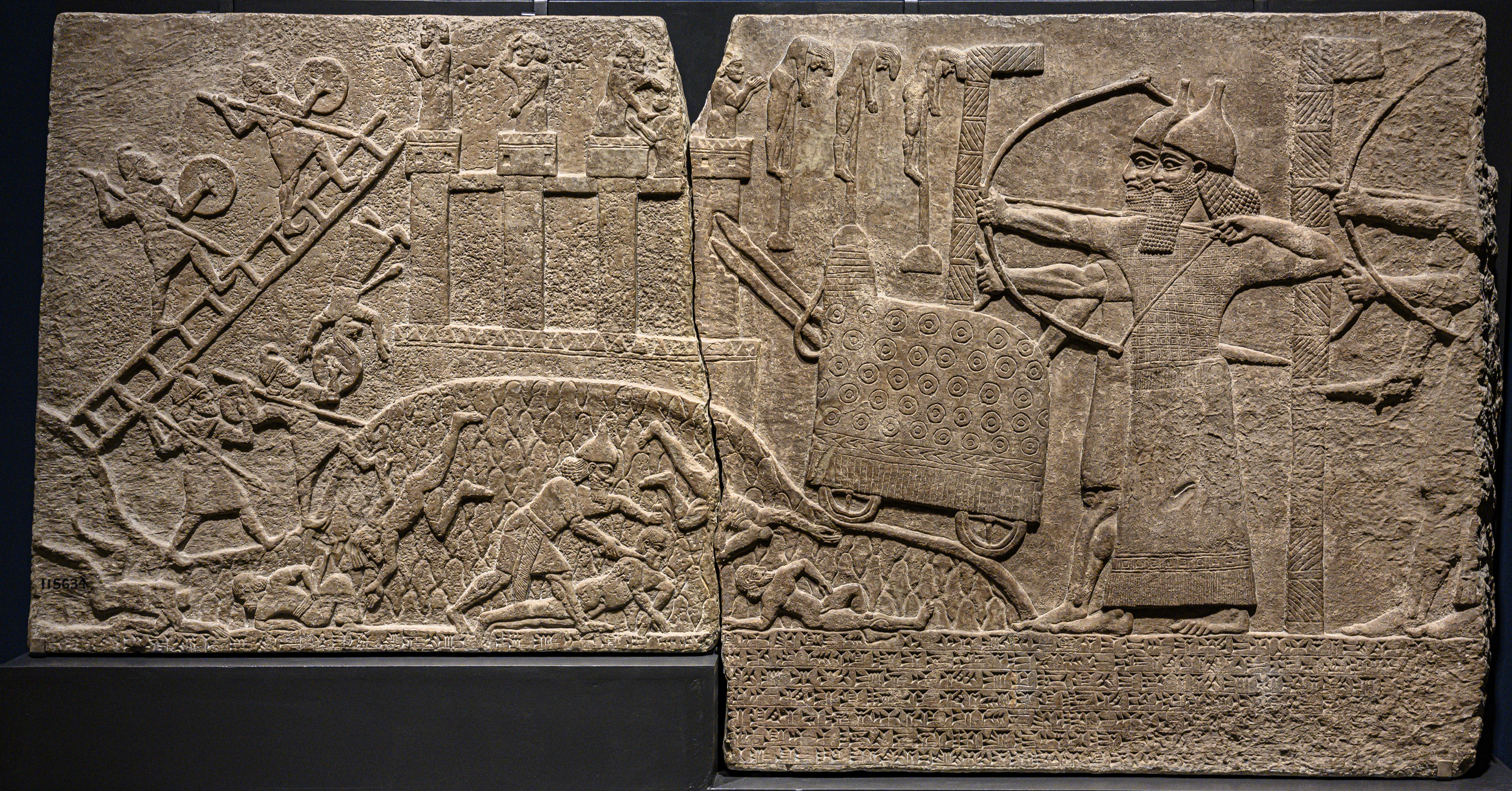
Siege engine in Assyrian relief of attack on an enemy town during the reign of Tiglath-Pileser III, 743–720 BC, from his palace at Nimrud

Lastly, as nation states evolved and empires grew, the increasing need for order and efficiency led to more records and writings. Officials and armies would have good reason for keeping detailed records and accounts involving anything concerning a matter such as warfare that, in the words of Sun Tzu, was "a matter of vital importance to the state". For all these reasons, military history comprises a large part of ancient history.

Notable militaries in the ancient world included the Egyptians, Assyrians, Babylonians, Persians, Ancient Greeks (notably the Spartans and Macedonians), Kushites, Indians (notably the Magadhas, Gangaridais, Gandharas and Cholas), early Imperial Chinese (notably the Qin and Han dynasties), Xiongnu Confederation, Ancient Romans, and Carthaginians.

The Fertile Crescent of Mesopotamia was the center of several prehistoric conquests. Mesopotamia was conquered by the Sumerians, Akkadians, Babylonians, Assyrians and Persians. Iranians were the first nation to introduce cavalry into their army.

Egypt began growing as an ancient power, but eventually fell to the Libyans, Nubians, Assyrians, Persians, Greeks, Romans, Byzantines, and Arabs.

The earliest recorded battle in India was the Battle of the Ten Kings. The Indian epics Mahabharata and Ramayana center on conflict and address military formations, theories of warfare, and esoteric weaponry. Chanakya's Arthashastra contains a detailed study of ancient warfare, including topics such as espionage and war elephants.

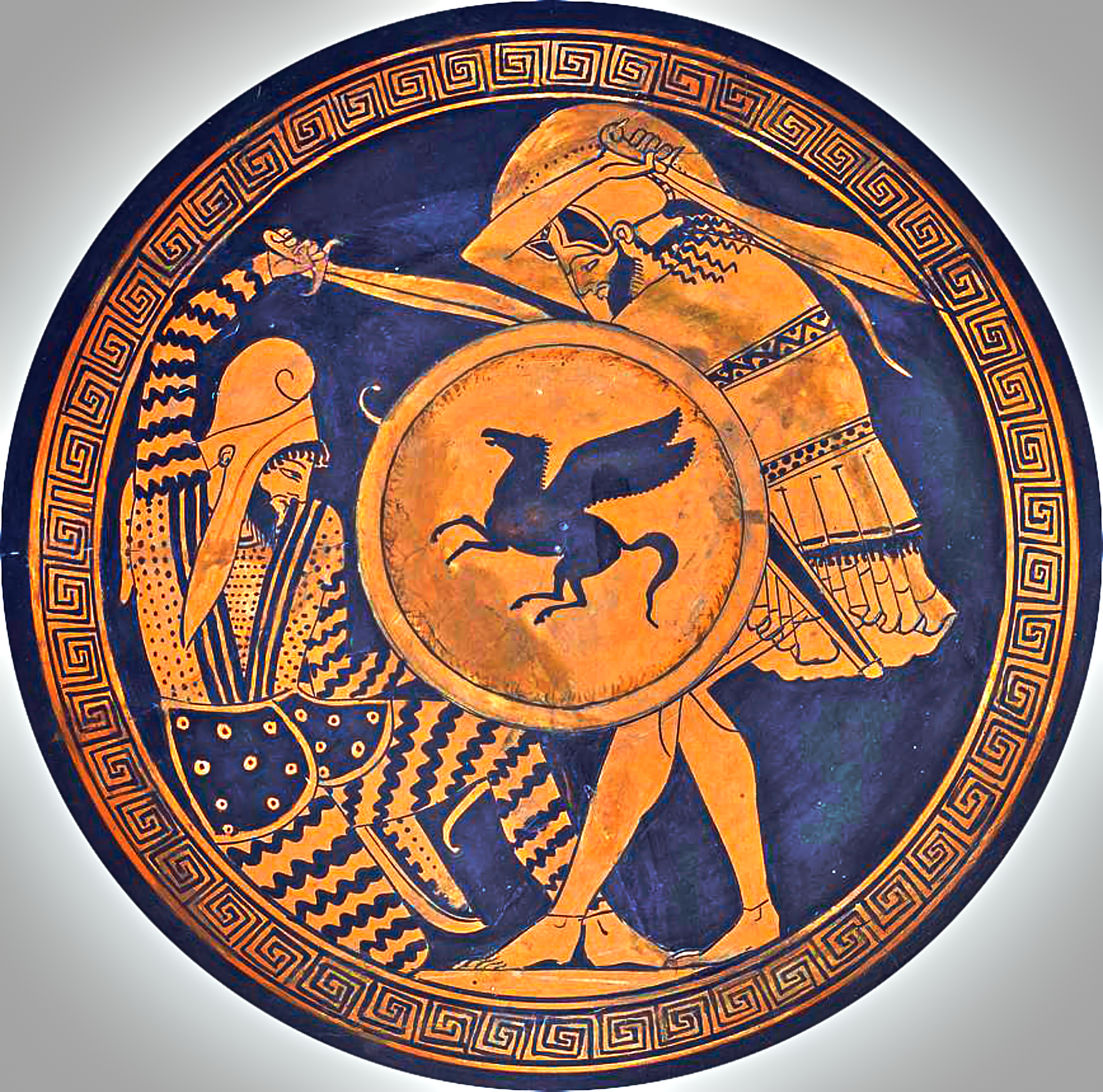
Greek hoplite (right) and Persian warrior depicted fighting, on an ancient kylix, 5th century BC

Alexander the Great invaded northwestern India and defeated King Porus in the Battle of the Hydaspes River. The same region was soon reconquered by Chandragupta Maurya after defeating the Macedonians and Seleucids. He also went on to conquer the Nanda Empire and unify northern India. Most of South Asia was unified under his grandson Ashoka the Great after the Kalinga War, though the empire collapsed not long after his reign.

In China, the Shang dynasty and Zhou dynasty had risen and collapsed. This led to the Warring States period, in which several states continued to fight over territory. Philosopher-strategists such as Confucius and Sun Tzu wrote various manuscripts on ancient warfare (as well as international diplomacy).

The Warring States-era philosopher Mozi (Micius) and his Mohist followers invented various siege weapons and siegecraft, including the Cloud Ladder (a four-wheeled, extendable ramp) for scaling fortified walls during sieges of enemy cities. The warring states were first unified by Qin Shi Huang after a series of military conquests, creating the first empire in China.

His empire was succeeded by the Han dynasty, which expanded into Central Asia, Northern China/Manchuria, Southern China, and present-day Korea and Vietnam. The Han came into conflict with settled people such as the Wiman Joseon, and proto-Vietnamese Nanyue. They also came into conflict with the Xiongnu (Huns), Yuezhi, and other steppe civilizations.

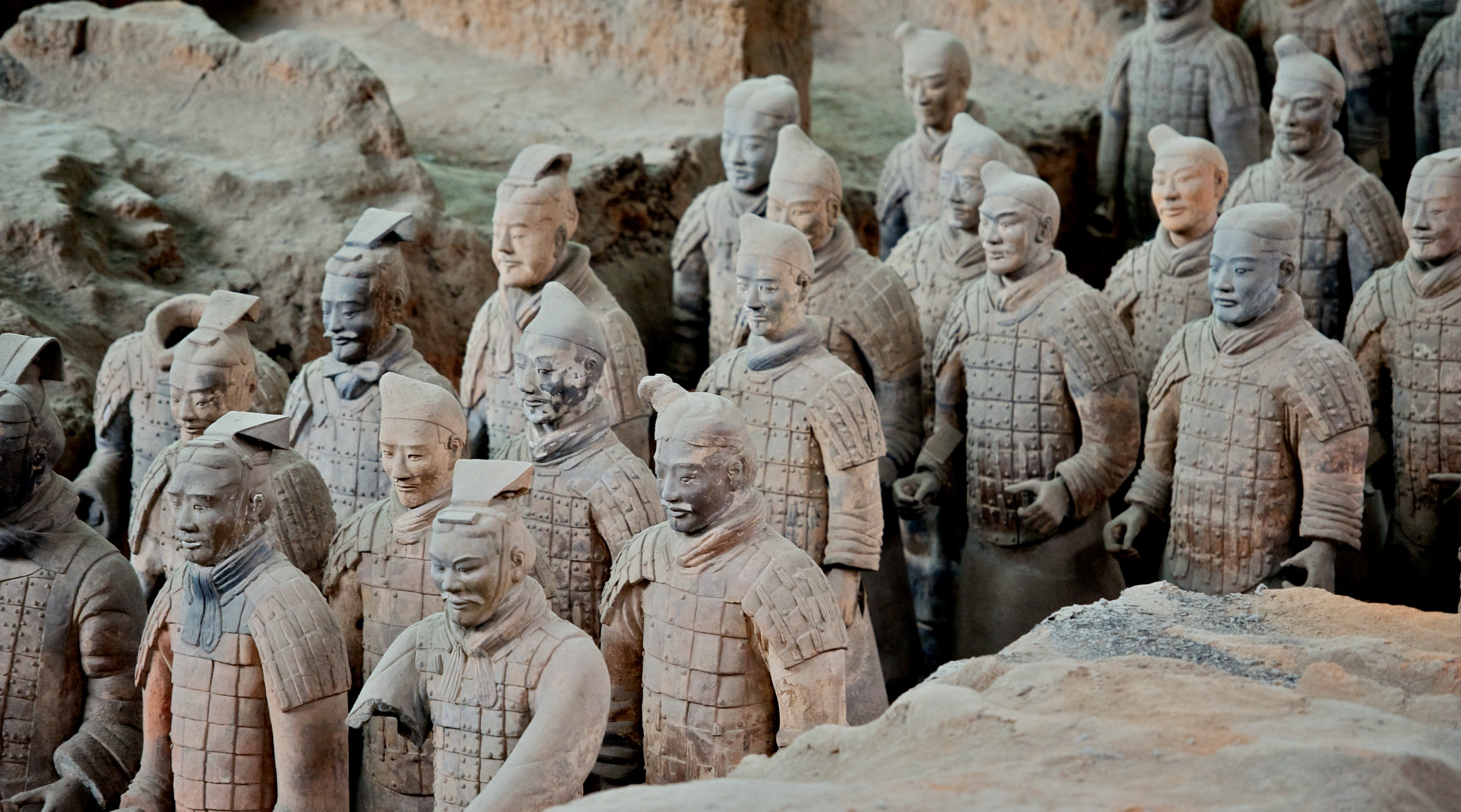
Lifelike soldier statues from the Terracotta Army, discovered near modern Xi'an, which was meant to guard the Mausoleum of the First Qin Emperor, 3rd century BC

The Han defeated and drove the Xiongnus west, securing the city-states along the silk route that continued into the Parthian Empire. After the decline of central imperial authority, the Han dynasty collapsed into an era of civil war and continuous warfare during the Three Kingdoms period in the 3rd century AD.

The Achaemenid Persian Empire was founded by Cyrus the Great after conquering the Median Empire, Neo-Babylonian Empire, Lydia and Asia Minor. His successor Cambyses went on to conquer the Egyptian Empire, much of Central Asia, and parts of Greece, India, and Libya. The empire later fell to Alexander the Great after defeating Darius III. After being ruled by the Seleucid dynasty, the Persian Empire was subsequently ruled by the Parthian and Sassanid dynasties, which were the Roman Empire's greatest rivals during the Roman-Persian Wars.

In Greece, several city-states rose to power, including Athens and Sparta. The Greeks repelled two Persian invasions: the first at the Battle of Marathon under Darius the Great, and the second at the naval Battle of Salamis where Themistocles ordered the Greek fleet and Xerxes I commanded the Persians, as well as at the land Battle of Plataea.

The Peloponnesian War then erupted between the two Greek powers, Athens and Sparta. Athens built a long wall to protect its inhabitants, but it also helped facilitate the spread of a plague that killed about 30,000 Athenians, including Pericles. After a disastrous campaign against Syracuse, the Athenian navy was decisively defeated by Lysander at the Battle of Aegospotami.

The Macedonians, under Philip II of Macedon and Alexander the Great, invaded Persia and won several major victories, establishing Macedonia as a major power. However, following Alexander's early death, the empire quickly fell apart.

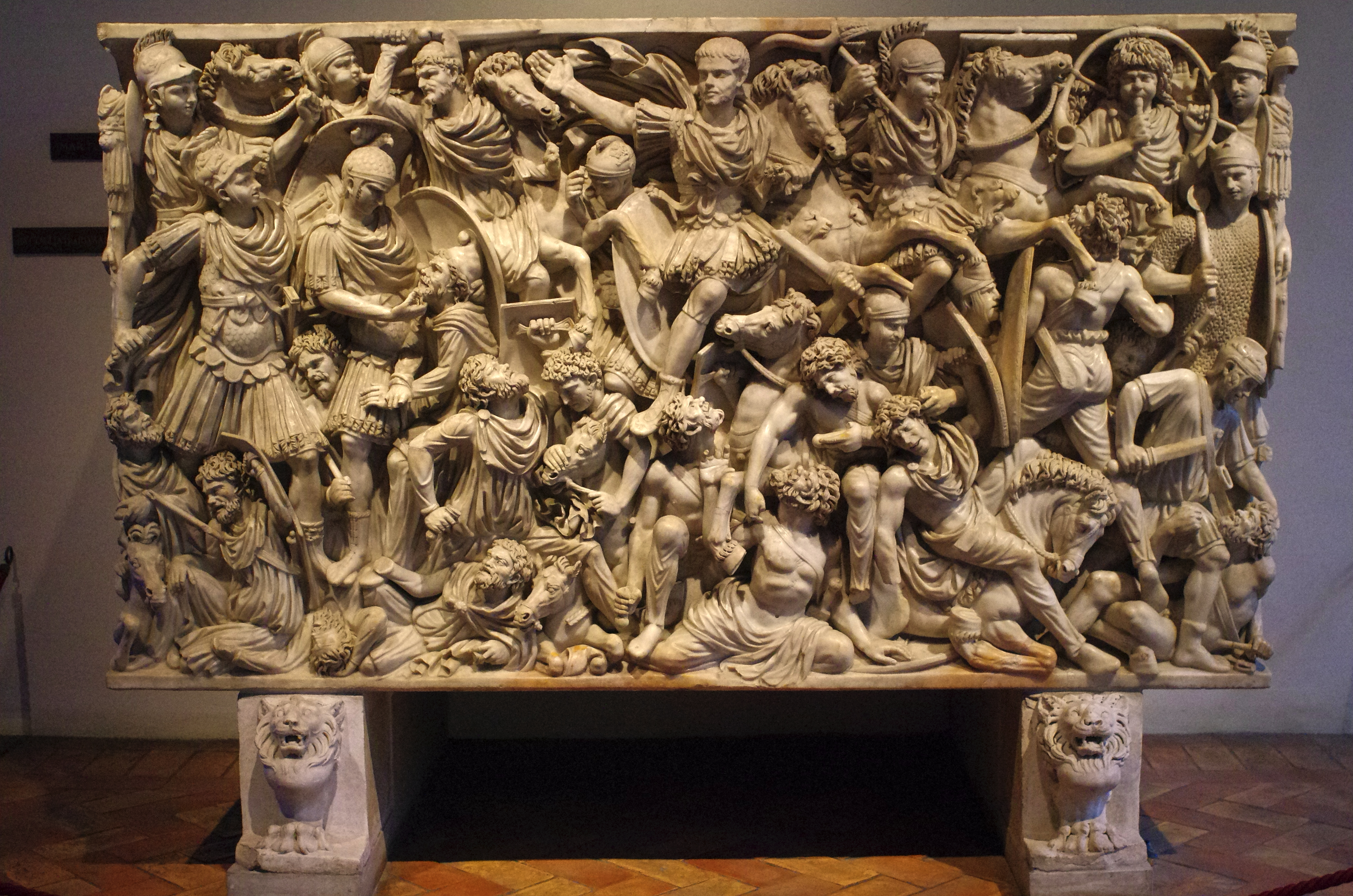
The 3rd-century Great Ludovisi sarcophagus depicts a battle between Romans and Goths.

Meanwhile, Rome was gaining power, following a rebellion against the Etruscans. During the three Punic Wars, the Romans defeated the neighboring power of Carthage. The First Punic War centered on naval warfare. The Second Punic War started with Hannibal's invasion of Italy by crossing the Alps. He famously won the encirclement at the Battle of Cannae. However, after Scipio invaded Carthage, Hannibal was forced to follow and was defeated at the Battle of Zama, ending Carthage's role as a power.

After Carthage's defeat, Rome rose as the Mediterranean's leading power, waging successful campaigns in Greece (Aemilius Paulus's decisive victory over Macedonia at the Battle of Pydna), the Middle East (Lucius Licinius Lucullus, Gnaeus Pompeius Magnus), Gaul (Gaius Julius Caesar) and against several Germanic tribes (Gaius Marius, Germanicus). Rome maintained its military dominance for centuries despite repeated major defeats, thanks to a large population, readiness to absorb losses, and superior training, organization, and tactics that consistently allowed its flexible forces to overcome larger tribal armies (see Battles of Aquae Sextiae, Vercellae, Tigranocerta, Alesia).

In 54 BC, the Roman triumvir Marcus Licinius Crassus took the offensive against the Parthian Empire in the east. In a decisive battle at Carrhae, the Romans were defeated, and the golden Aquilae (legionary battle standards) were taken as trophies to Ctesiphon. The battle was one of the worst defeats suffered by the Roman Republic in its entire history.

While successfully dealing with foreign opponents, Rome experienced numerous civil wars, notably the power struggles of Roman generals such as Marius and Sulla during the end of the Republic. Caesar was also notable for his role in the civil war against the other member of the Triumvirate (Pompey) and against the Roman Senate.

The successors of Caesar—Octavian and Mark Anthony—also fought a civil war against Caesar's assassins (the Senators Brutus, Cassius, etc.). Octavian and Mark Anthony eventually fought another civil war to determine who would be the sole ruler of Rome. Octavian emerged victorious, and Rome became an empire with a large standing army of professional soldiers.

By the time of Marcus Aurelius, the Romans had expanded to the Atlantic Ocean in the west and to Mesopotamia in the east and controlled Northern Africa and Central Europe up to the Black Sea. However, Aurelius marked the end of the Five Good Emperors, and Rome quickly fell into decline.

The Huns, Goths, and other barbaric groups invaded Rome, which continued to suffer from inflation and other internal strifes. Despite the attempts of Diocletian, Constantine I, and Theodosius I, western Rome collapsed and was eventually conquered in 476. The Byzantine empire continued to prosper, however.

=== Medieval warfare ===
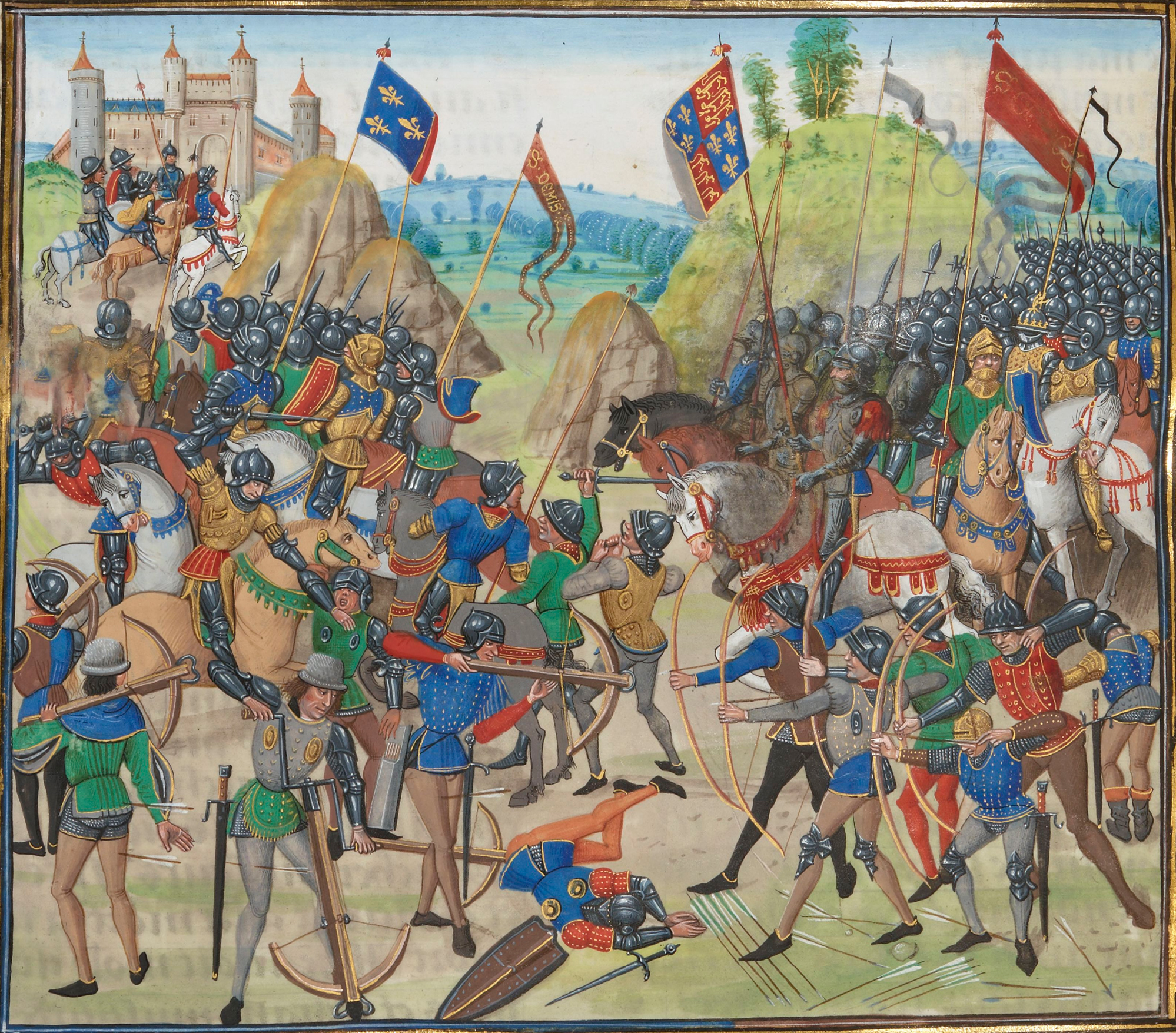
Battle of Crécy (1346) between the English and French in the Hundred Years' War.

When stirrups came into use sometime during the Dark Ages, militaries were forever changed. This invention, coupled with technological, cultural, and social developments, had forced a dramatic transformation in the character of warfare from antiquity, changing military tactics and the role of cavalry and artillery.

Similar patterns of warfare existed in other parts of the world. In China, around the 5th century, armies shifted from massed infantry to cavalry-based forces, copying the steppe nomads. The Middle East and North Africa used technologies similar to, if often more advanced than, those of Europe.

In Japan, the Medieval warfare period is considered by many to have stretched into the 19th century. In Africa, along the Sahel and in Sudan, states like the Kingdom of Sennar and the Fulani Empire employed Medieval tactics and weapons well after they had been supplanted in Europe.

In the Medieval period, feudalism was firmly implanted, and there existed many landlords in Europe. Landlords often owned castles to protect their territory.

The Islamic Arab Empires began rapidly expanding throughout the Middle East, North Africa, and Central Asia, initially led by the Rashidun Caliphate, and later under the Umayyads. While their attempts to invade Europe by way of the Balkans were defeated by Byzantium and Bulgaria, the Arabs expanded to the Iberian Peninsula in the west and the Indus Valley in the east. The Abbasids then took over the Arab Empire, though the Umayyads remained in control of Islamic Spain.

At the Battle of Tours, the Franks under Charles Martel stopped short a Muslim invasion. After the Abbasids beat the Tang Chinese forces at the Battle of Talas, they were later overcome by the Seljuk Turks and the Mongols, and the Arab Empire collapsed following the Battle of Baghdad in 1258.

In China, the Sui dynasty had risen and conquered the Chen dynasty of the south. They invaded Vietnam (northern Vietnam had been under Chinese control since the Han dynasty), fighting the troops of Champa, who mounted cavalry on elephants. After decades of economic turmoil and a failed invasion of Korea, the Sui collapsed and was followed by the Tang dynasty, who fought with various Turkic groups, the Tibetans of Lhasa, the Tanguts, the Khitans, and collapsed due to political fragmentation of powerful regional military governors (jiedushi). The innovative Song dynasty followed next, inventing new weapons of war that employed Greek fire and gunpowder (see section below) against enemies such as the Jurchens.

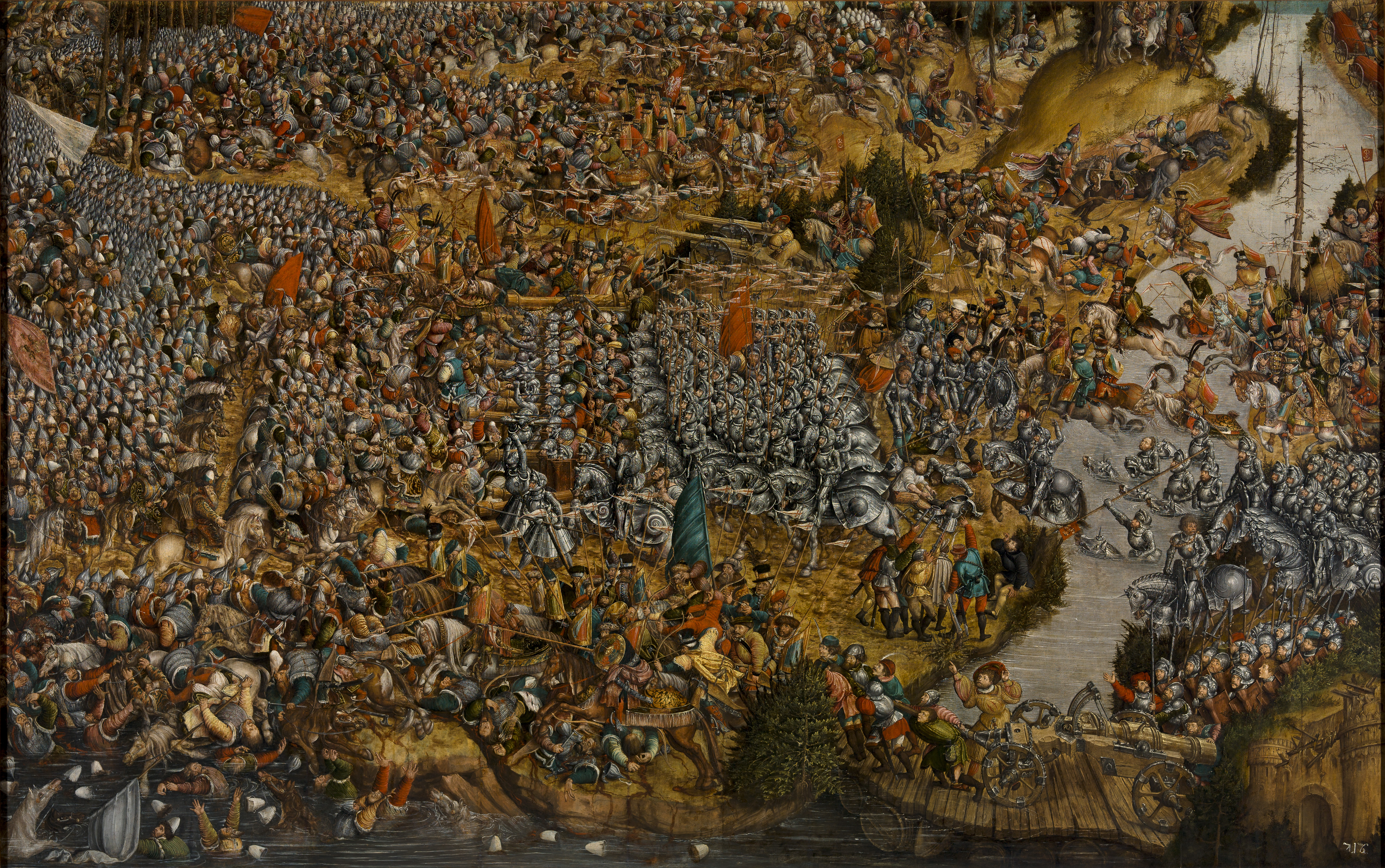
The victory of the Polish-Lithuanian forces over the Muscovites at the Battle of Orsha in 1514

The Mongols under Genghis Khan, Ögedei Khan, Möngke Khan, and Kublai Khan conquered most of Eurasia. They took over China, Persia, Turkestan, and Russia. After Kublai Khan took power and established the Yuan dynasty, the empire's divisions ceased to cooperate, and the Mongol Empire was only nominally united.

In New Zealand, before European discovery, oral histories, legends, and whakapapa include many stories of battles and wars. Māori warriors were held in high esteem. One group of Polynesians migrated to the Chatham Islands, where they developed the largely pacifist Moriori culture. Their pacifism left the Moriori unable to defend themselves when mainland Māori invaded the islands in the 1830s.

They proceeded to massacre the Moriori and enslave the survivors. Warrior culture also developed in the isolated Hawaiian Islands. During the 1780s and 1790s, the chiefs and alii were constantly fighting for power. After a series of battles, the Hawaiian Islands were united for the first time under a single ruler who would become known as Kamehameha I.

=== Early modern warfare ===
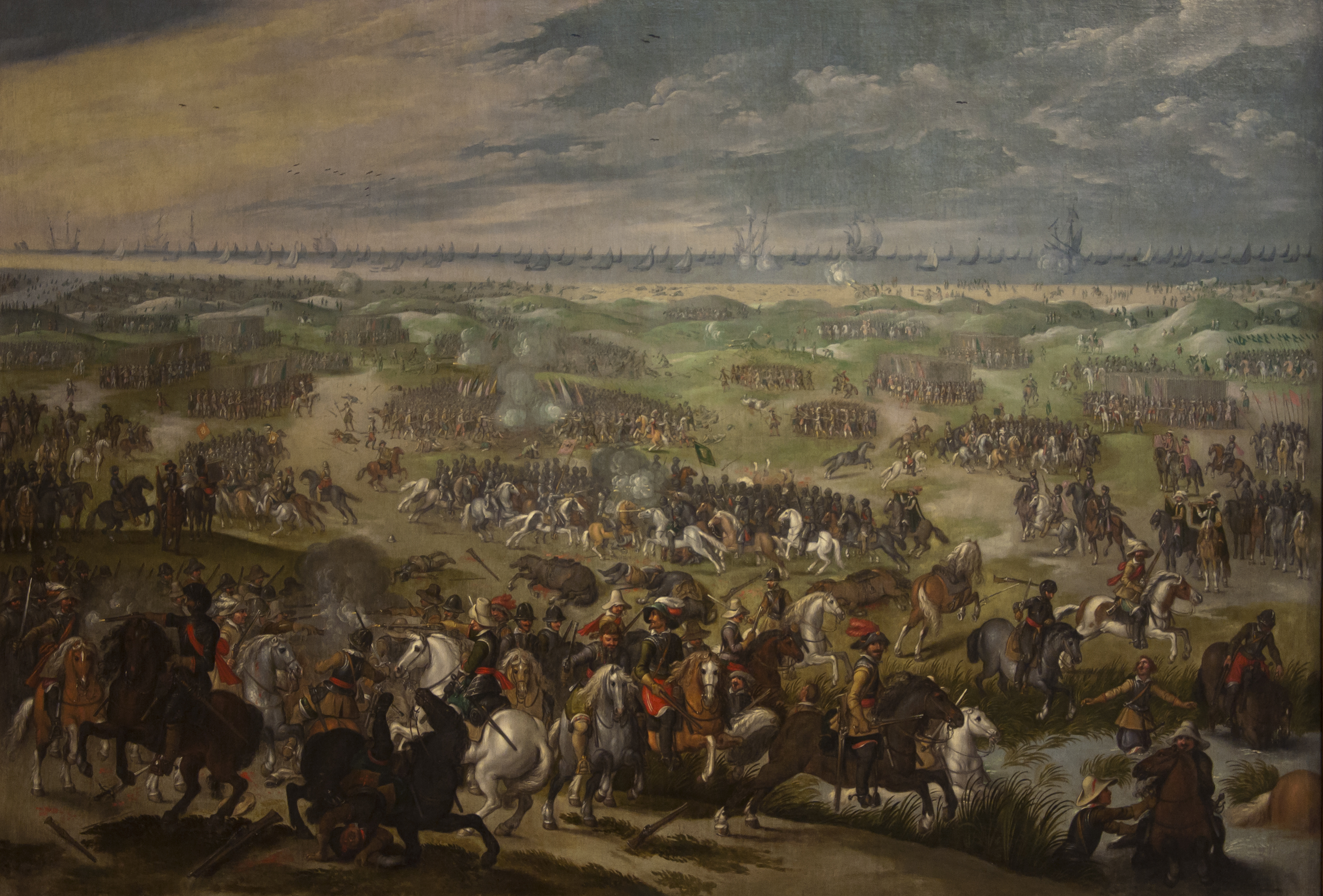
Eighty Years' War, or Dutch Revolt against Spain, painting by Sebastiaen Vrancx

After gunpowder weapons were first developed in Song dynasty China (see also: Technology of the Song dynasty), the technology later spread west to the Ottoman Empire, from where it spread to the Safavid Empire of Persia and the Mughal Empire of India. European armies later adopted the arquebus during the Italian Wars of the early 16th century.

This all brought an end to the dominance of armored cavalry on the battlefield. The simultaneous decline of the feudal system—and the absorption of the medieval city-states into larger states—allowed the creation of professional standing armies to replace the feudal levies and mercenaries that had been the standard military component of the Middle Ages.

In Africa, Ahmad ibn Ibrihim al-Ghazi was the first African commander to use gunpowder on the continent in the Ethiopian–Adal War, which lasted for fourteen years (1529–1543).

The period spanning between the 1648 Peace of Westphalia and the 1789 French Revolution is also known as Kabinettskriege (Princes' warfare) as wars were mainly carried out by imperial or monarchical states, decided by cabinets and limited in scope and in their aims. They also engaged in rapid shifts in alliances and primarily relied on mercenaries.

Over the course of the 18th–19th centuries all military arms and services underwent significant developments that included a more mobile field artillery, the transition from use of battalion infantry drill in close order to open order formations and the transfer of emphasis from the use of bayonets to the rifle that replaced the musket, and virtual replacement of all types of cavalry with the universal dragoons, or mounted infantry.

=== Military Revolution ===
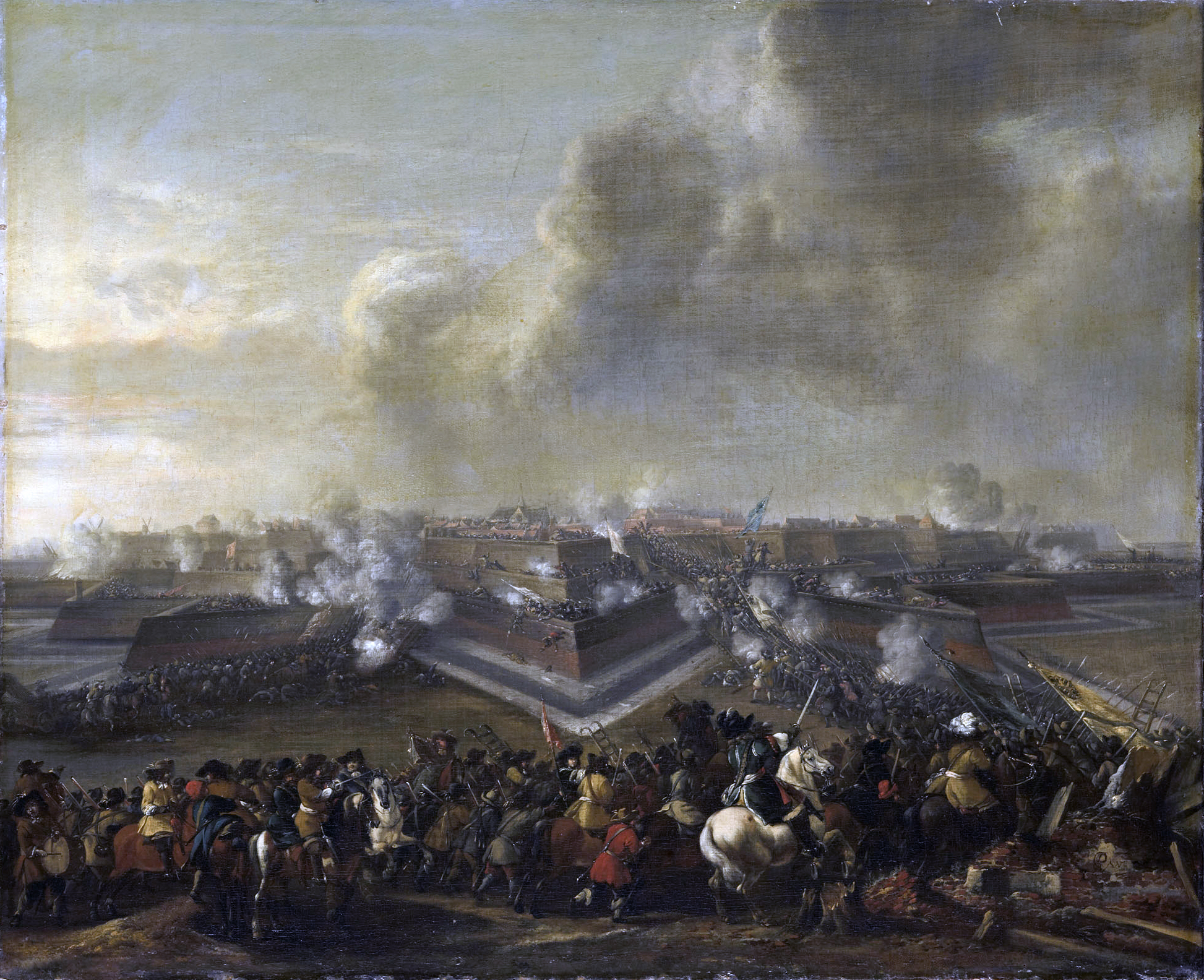
Dutch forces storming Coevorden during the Franco-Dutch War, 1672

The Military Revolution is a conceptual schema for explaining the transformation of European military strategy, tactics, and technology in the early modern period. The argument is that dramatic advances in technology, government finance, and public administration transformed and modernized European armies, tactics, and logistics. Since warfare was so central to the European state, the transformation had a major impact on the modernization of government bureaucracies, taxation, and the national economy.

The concept was introduced by Michael Roberts in the 1950s, as he focused on the Swedish Empire, 1560–1660. Roberts emphasized the introduction of muskets that could not be aimed at small targets but could be very effective when fired in volleys by three ranks of infantry, with one rank firing while the other two reloaded. All three ranks march forward to demolish the enemy. The infantry now had the firepower previously reserved for the artillery and the mobility to advance rapidly on the battlefield, which the artillery lacked. The infantry thereby surpassed the artillery in tactical maneuvering on the battlefield. Roberts linked these advances to broader historical consequences, arguing that innovations in tactics, drill, and doctrine by the Dutch and Swedes, 1560–1660, led to a need for more and better-trained troops, and thus for permanent forces (standing armies). Armies grew much larger and more expensive. These changes, in turn, had major political consequences for the level of administrative support and the supply of money, men, and provisions, producing new financial demands and the creation of new governmental institutions. "Thus, argued Roberts, the modern art of war made possible—and necessary—the creation of the modern state".

In the 1990s, the concept was modified and extended by Geoffrey Parker, who argued that developments in fortification and siege warfare caused the revolution. The concept of a military revolution based on technology has given way to models based more on slow evolution, in which technology plays a minor role in organization, command and control, logistics, and, in general, non-material improvements. The revolutionary nature of these changes was only apparent after a long evolution that gave Europe a dominant role in warfare, a role that the Industrial Revolution would confirm.

The concept of a military revolution in the sixteenth and seventeenth centuries has received a mixed reception among historians. Noted military historians Michael Duffy and Jeremy Black have strongly criticised it as misleading, exaggerated, and simplistic.

=== Industrial warfare ===
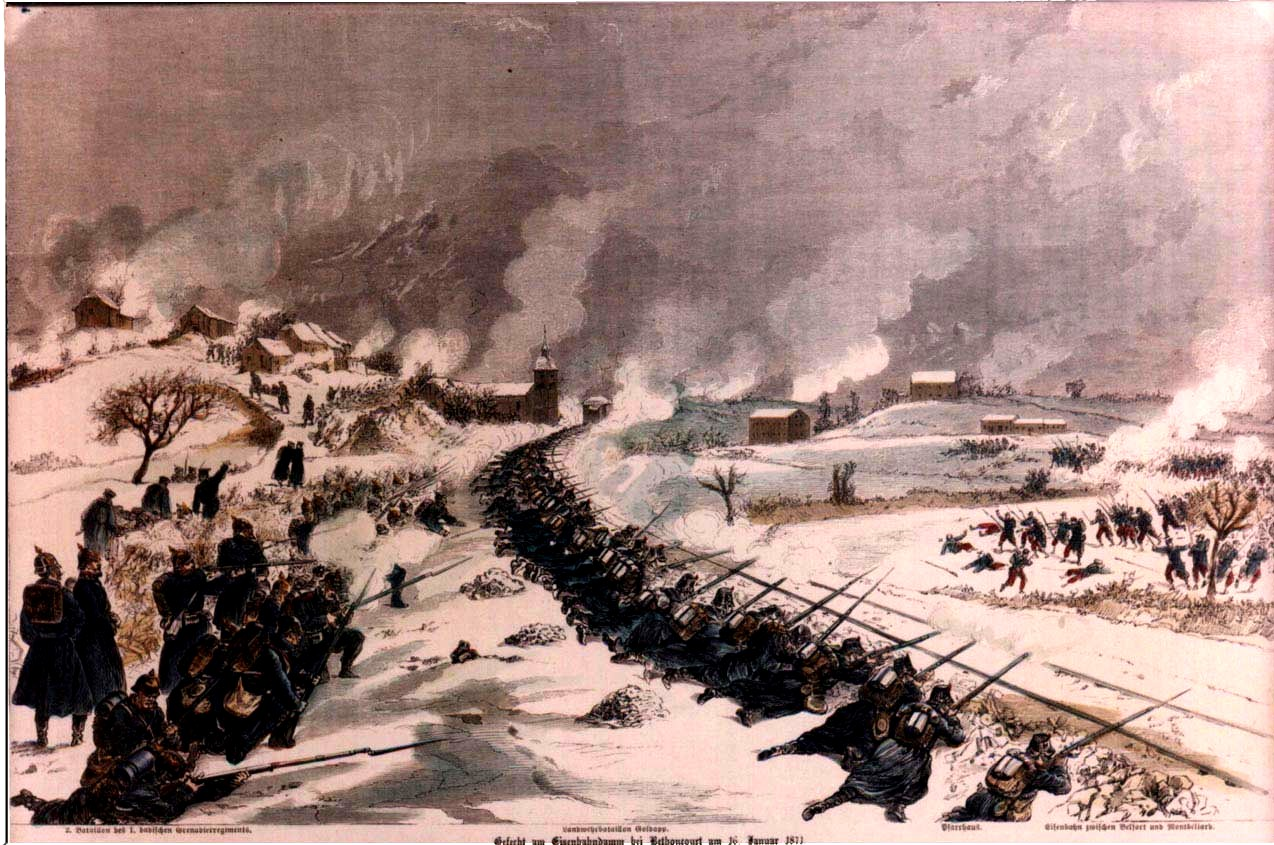
Franco-Prussian War

As weapons—particularly small arms—became easier to use, countries began to abandon a complete reliance on professional soldiers in favor of conscription. Technological advances became increasingly important; while the armies of the previous period had usually had similar weapons, the industrial age saw encounters such as the Battle of Sadowa, in which possession of a more advanced technology played a decisive role in the outcome. Conscription was employed in industrial warfare to increase the number of military personnel available for combat. Conscription was notably used by Napoleon Bonaparte and the major parties during the two World Wars.

Total war was used in industrial warfare to prevent the opposing nation from engaging in war. Napoleon was the innovator. William Tecumseh Sherman's "March to the Sea" and Philip Sheridan's burning of the Shenandoah Valley during the American Civil War were examples. On the largest scale the strategic bombing of enemy cities and industrial factories during World War II was total warfare.

=== Modern warfare ===
Since the 1940s, preparation for a major war has been based on technological arms races involving all sorts of new weapons systems, such as nuclear and biological, as well as computerized control systems, and the opening of new venues, such as seen in the Space race involving the United States, the Soviet Union, and more recently, China.

Modern war also saw improvements in armored tank technology. While tanks were present in the First World War, and the Second World War, armored warfare technology came to a head with the start of the Cold War. Many of the technologies commonly seen on main battle tanks today, such as composite armor, high-caliber cannons, and advanced targeting systems, would be developed during this period.

A distinctive feature since 1945 is the decline in the number and casualties of interstate wars. Instead, actual fighting has largely been limited to civil wars and insurgencies. The major exceptions were the Indo-Pakistani War of 1971, the Iran–Iraq War 1980–1988, the Gulf War of 1990–1991, and the Russo-Ukrainian War.

== See also ==
- War Studies
- List of wars by death toll
- Ancient Greek warfare
- Military science
- List of military writers
- Maritime history
- Military globalization
- Naval history
- Roman warfare
- Society for Military History
- Military of ancient Egypt
- Military history of ancient Rome
- Military history of Africa
- Military history of Europe
- Military history of Oceania
- Military history of North America
- Military history of South America
- Military history by country
- Journal of Military History, scholarly journal
- War in History, scholarly journal
- War & Society, scholarly journal
- History of physical training and fitness
