= Norden =

Norden is a Scandinavian and German word, directly translated as "the North". It may refer to:

== Places ==
=== England ===
- Norden, Basingstoke, a ward of Basingstoke and Deane
- Norden, Dorset, a hamlet near Corfe Castle
- Norden, Greater Manchester, a village near Rochdale

=== Germany ===
- Norden, Lower Saxony, a town in East Frisia
- Norden (Hambach Forest), a former tree-house colony by environmental activists

=== United States ===
- Norden, California, an unincorporated community
- Norden, Nebraska, an unincorporated community
- Norden Township, Minnesota

== Businesses ==
- D/S Norden, a Danish shipping company
- Coop Norden, a joint Scandinavian co-operative retail chain
- Norden Systems, an American electronics manufacturer

== People ==
=== Given name ===
- Norden Hartman (1921–1989), South African archivist and herald
- Norden E. Huang (born 1937), Taiwanese-American engineer
- Norden Tenzing Bhutia (1950–2019), musician, composer and singer of classic Nepali pop songs

=== Surname ===
- Norden (surname), a list of people with the surname Norden

== Other uses ==
- Norden bombsight, used on US bombers during World War II, the Korean War, and the Vietnam War
- Norden Cricket Club, near Rochdale, England
- Norden Farm Centre for the Arts, an arts centre in Berkshire, England
- Rotary Norden, Nordic magazine for the Nordic countries
- Der Norden, a publication (1935-1944?) of the Nordische Gesellschaft
- Norden, original name of the MV Captayannis, a Greek merchant vessel

== See also ==
- Norden railway station (disambiguation)
- Nordic countries, also called Norden
