= Norden (surname) =

Norden is a surname. Notable people with the surname include:

- Albert Norden (1904–1982), German politician
- Bengt Nordén (born 1945), Swedish chemist
- Betsy Norden (born 1945), American opera singer
- Caren Norden, German biophysicist
- Carl Norden (1880–1965), engineer, responsible for designing the Norden bombsight
- Cecily Norden (1918–2011), South African author, horse judge, rider, and breeder
- Christine Norden (1924–1988), British actress
- Claes Nordén (born 1993), Swedish professional ice hockey player
- Denis Norden (1922–2018), British comedy writer and television presenter
- Eduard Norden (1868–1941), German philologist and historian of religion
- Francisco Norden (born 1929), Colombian film director
- Frederic Louis Norden (1708–1742), Danish captain and explorer
- Gustaf Nordén (1884–1947), Swedish athlete
- Harald Norden (born 1933), German speed skater
- Heinz Norden (1905–1978), American author
- Hermann Norden (1868/1869–1931), American travel writer
- John Norden (c. 1547–1625), English topographer
- John Norden (MP) (1612–1669), English lawyer and politician
- Lisa Nordén (born 1984), Swedish professional triathlete
- Marie Nordén (born 1967), Swedish politician
- Richard Norden (cricketer) (1879–1952), South African cricketer
- Richard Norden (soldier) (1948–1972), Australian soldier and Victoria Cross recipient
- Robert Norden (c. 1650–1725), Baptist preacher
- Robert Nordén (1926–1998), Norwegian economist and politician
- Tommy Norden (born 1952), American actor
- Virginia Norden (1879–1948), American actress
