= Nordisk =

Nordisk is a Scandinavian word meaning Nordic.

It is commonly found in the names of various entities and organizations based in the Nordic countries, including:

- Nordisk Copyright Bureau, Danish copyright collecting society
- Nordisk Film, Danish film studio
- Nordisk Mobiltelefon, Swedish mobile telephone network operator
- Novo Nordisk, Danish pharmaceutical company
- Nordisk familjebok, Swedish encyclopedia
