= Robert Norden =

Robert Norden (c. 1650–1725) was a Baptist preacher influential in the establishment of Baptist churches in the colony of Virginia prior to the American War of Independence. The oldest Baptist church in the southern United States, First Baptist Church of Charleston, South Carolina, was organised in 1682 under the leadership of William Screven. and a Baptist church was formed in Virginia in 1715 through the influence of Norden's preaching.

He was born in Warbleton, East Sussex, England about 1650. In 1714, English Baptists appointed Norden, along with Thomas White, as “messengers” sent to a group of Baptists who had settled along the south side of the James River in Virginia; however, White died at sea. Norden died in 1725.
