= Caren Norden =

German biophysicist

- Education: University of Hanover; ETH Zurich
- Scientific career
- Workplaces: University of Cambridge; Instituto Gulbenkian de Ciência; Max Planck Institute of Molecular Cell Biology and Genetics
- Thesis: Investigating spartial and temporal coordination of cytokinesis with spindle function (2005)

Caren Norden is a German cell and developmental biologist who is a Principal Investigator at the Gulbenkian Institute for Molecular Medicine, in Portugal. Formerly, she was Deputy Director for Science at the Instituto Gulbenkian de Ciência and worked as a group leader at the Max Planck Institute of Molecular Cell Biology and Genetics. Her research considers the cell biology of tissue morphogenesis.

== Early life and education ==
Norden was an undergraduate student in biochemistry at the University of Hanover. She worked in the laboratory of Bettina Winckler in the Mount Sinai Health System. In 2006, Norden earned her doctorate from ETH Zurich. She moved to the Institute of Physiology at the University of Cambridge.

== Research and career ==
Norden was made a group leader at the Max Planck Institute of Molecular Cell Biology and Genetics (MPI-CBG) in 2010. She was elected to the European Molecular Biology Organization in 2020.

Norden's research considers the neural processes that underpin the formation of the vertebrate eye, retinal neurogenesis and lamination. Nodren makes use of zebrafish as a model organism. She uncovered the importance of the positions of cell nuclei in the correct formation of a retina.

== Selected publications ==
- Martin Weigert; Uwe Schmidt; Tobias Boothe; et al. (26 November 2018). "Content-aware image restoration: pushing the limits of fluorescence microscopy". Nature Methods. 15 (12): 1090–1097. doi:10.1038/s41592-018-0216-7. ISSN 1548-7091. PMID 30478326. Wikidata Q93381609.
- Caren Norden; Manuel Mendoza; Jeroen Dobbelaere; Chitra V Kotwaliwale; Sue Biggins; Yves Barral (7 April 2006). "The NoCut pathway links completion of cytokinesis to spindle midzone function to prevent chromosome breakage". Cell. 125 (1): 85–98. doi:10.1016/j.cell.2006.01.045. ISSN 0092-8674. PMID 16615892. Wikidata Q27929782.
- Caren Norden; Stephen Young; Brian A Link; William A Harris (1 September 2009). "Actomyosin is the main driver of interkinetic nuclear migration in the retina". Cell. 138 (6): 1195–1208. doi:10.1016/j.cell.2009.06.032. ISSN 0092-8674. PMC 2791877. PMID 19766571. Wikidata Q37470638.
