= Norse =

Norse is either a demonym for Norsemen, a Medieval North Germanic ethnolinguistic group ancestral to modern Scandinavians, defined as speakers of Old Norse from about the 9th to the 13th centuries, or Norwegians specifically, a group descended from the Old Norse.

Norse may also refer to:

== Culture and religion ==
- Norse mythology
- Norse paganism
- Norse art
- Norse activity in the British Isles
- Vikings

== Language ==
- Norwegian language
- Proto-Norse language, the Germanic language predecessor of Old Norse
- Old Norse, a North Germanic language spoken in Scandinavia and areas under Scandinavian influence from c. 800 AD to c. 1300 AD
  - Old West Norse, the western dialect of Old Norse, spoken in Norway and areas under Norwegian influence
    - Greenlandic Norse
    - Norn language, an extinct North Germanic language that was spoken in Shetland and Orkney, off the north coast of mainland Scotland, and in Caithness
  - Old East Norse, the eastern dialect of Old Norse, spoken in Denmark, Sweden and areas under their influence

== Location ==
- Norse, Texas, a ghost town founded by Nordic pioneers
- Nordic countries
- Scandinavia

== Companies ==
- Norse Atlantic Airways, a Norwegian airline
- Norse Projects, a Danish clothing brand

== Sport ==
- Luther College Norse, the intercollegiate athletic program of Luther College
- Mesabi Range Norse, the intercollegiate athletic program of Mesabi Range College
- Northern Kentucky Norse, the intercollegiate athletic program of Northern Kentucky University

== Other uses ==
- Harold Norse (1916–2009), American poet
- New-onset refractory status epilepticus, a medical condition (acronym "NORSE")
- Norse (neuron simulator), a simulation environment for biological neurons; see Spiking neural network § SNN simulation

== See also ==
- Nordic (disambiguation)
- Norsca, a fictional land in the Warhammer Fantasy game setting
