= Norden railway station =

Norden railway station may refer to

- Norden railway station (England)
- Norden railway station (Germany)
