= List of acronyms: P =

This list contains acronyms, initialisms, and pseudo-blends that begin with the letter P.

For the purposes of this list:

- acronym = an abbreviation pronounced as if it were a word, e.g., SARS = severe acute respiratory syndrome, pronounced to rhyme with cars
- initialism = an abbreviation pronounced wholly or partly using the names of its constituent letters, e.g., CD = compact disc, pronounced cee dee
- pseudo-blend = an abbreviation whose extra or omitted letters mean that it cannot stand as a true acronym, initialism, or portmanteau (a word formed by combining two or more words).

(a) = acronym, e.g.: SARS – (a) severe acute respiratory syndrome
(i) = initialism, e.g.: CD – (i) compact disc
(p) = pseudo-blend, e.g.: UNIFEM – (p) United Nations Development Fund for Women
(s) = symbol (none of the above, representing and pronounced as something else; for example: MHz – megahertz)

Some terms are spoken as either acronym or initialism, e.g., VoIP, pronounced both as voyp and V-O-I-P.

(Main list of acronyms)

- p – (s) pico
- P – (s) Peta – Phosphorus

== P0–9 ==
- P2P – (i) Peer-to-peer (networking)
- P3I or P^{3}I – (i) PrePlanned Product Improvement

== PA ==
- pa – (s) Punjabi language (ISO 639-1 code)
- pA – (s) picoampere
- Pa
  - (s) pascal
  - Protactinium
- PA
  - (a/i) Pamela Anderson
  - (s) Panama (ISO 3166 digram)
  - Paraguay (FIPS 10-4 country code)
  - (i) Partial Agonist
  - (s) Pennsylvania (postal symbol)
  - petampere
  - (i) PolyAmide (Nylon)
  - Prince Albert piercing
  - Public Address (vocal amplification system)
  - Public Affairs
- PA 6 – (s) Nylon 6 (PolyAmide) (similarly for PA 11, 12, 46, 66, 610)
- PAA – (i) Position Area for Artillery
- PAB – (s) Panamanian balboa (ISO 4217 currency code)
- PABX – (p) Private Automated Branch eXchange (company phone system)
- PAC
  - (i) Pan Africanist Congress
  - (a) Partial Solar Calibrator
  - Patriot Advanced Capabilities
  - Political action committee
  - (a/i) Primary Auditory Cortex
- PACER – (a) Public Access to Court Electronic Records (U.S. federal courts)
- PACOM – (p) (U.S.) Pacific Command
- PADD
  - (a) Personal Access Display Device (as seen in the Star Trek franchise)
  - Petroleum Administration for Defense Districts, used for data collection in the U.S. petroleum industry
- PADI – (a) Professional Association of Diving Instructors
- PAEK – (i) PolyArylEtherKetone
- PAFC – (i) Plymouth Argyle Football Club
- PAH – (i) Polycyclic aromatic hydrocarbon
- PAHO – (i) Pan American Health Organization
- PAI
  - (i) PolyAmide Imide
  - Pre-Approval Inspection (pharma)
- PAK – (s) Pakistan (ISO 3166 trigram)
- Pakistan – (p) Punjab, Afghan states, Kashmir, sIndh, baluchiSTAN
- PAL
  - (a) Phase Alternating Line (TV standard)
  - (p) Philippine Airlines
- PAM – (a/i) Precision Attack Missile
- Pamida – (p) Patrick, Michael, and David, sons of the department store chain's co-founder Jim Witherspoon
- PAMELA
  - (a) Payload for Antimatter Matter Exploration and Light-nuclei Astrophysics
  - (a) Pedestrian Accessibility and Movement Environment Laboratory
- pan – (s) Punjabi language (ISO 639-2 code)
- PAN
  - (s) Panama (ISO 3166 trigram)
  - (a) Partai Amanat Nasional (Indonesian, "National Mandate Party") – Indonesian political party
  - Partido Acción Nacional (Spanish, "National Action Party") – political parties in El Salvador, Mexico, and Nicaragua
  - Partido de Avanzada Nacional (Spanish, "National Advancement Party") – Guatemalan political party
  - Personal area network
  - (i) PolyAcryloNitrile
  - (a) Programa de Asistencia Nutricional (Spanish, "Nutritional Assistance Program") – U.S. federal program for nutritional needs of poor families in Puerto Rico
- PANS – (a) Pretty Advanced/Awesome Network Services (cf. POTS)
- Pan-STARRS – (p) Panoramic Survey Telescope And Rapid Response System
- PAO
  - (i) Panathinaikos Athlitikos Omilos (Greek: Παναθηναϊκός Αθλητικός Όμιλος, "Pan-Athenian Athletic Club")
  - (a/i) Poly Alpha Olefin
  - Public Affairs Officer
- PAOK – (i) Panthessalonikeios Athlitikós Ómilos Konstantinoupoliton (Greek Πανθεσσαλονίκειος Αθλητικός Όμιλος Κωνσταντινοπολιτών, "Pan-Thessalonian Athletic Club of Constantinopolites")
- PAP
  - (i) People's Action Party (Singapore)
  - (a) Internet slang for Post a Picture
- PAPI – (a) Precision Approach Path Indicator (aviation)
- PAR – (s) Paraguay (IOC and FIFA trigram, but not ISO 3166)
- PARC – (a) Palo Alto Research Center
- PAROS – (a) Prevention of an Arms Race in Outer Space (treaty)
- PARP – (i) (NATO Partnership for Peace) Planning And Review Process
- PARWIG – (a) Power Augmented Ram Wing In Ground (aeroplane wing shape)
- PAS – See entry
- PASA – (i) PolyAmide, Semi-Aromatic (Nylon)
- PASGT – (i) Personnel Armor System, Ground Troops
- PASR – (i) Personnel Accounting and Strength Reporting
- PatD - (s) Panic! at the Disco
- PATH – (a) Port Authority Trans-Hudson
- PAWS
  - (a) Phased Array Warning System
  - Progressive Animal Welfare Society
- PAYD – (a) Pay As You Drive
- PAYE – (a) Pay As You Earn

== PB ==
- Pb – (s) Lead (Latin Plumbum)
- PB – (p) PolyButylene
- PBA
  - (i) Philippine Basketball Association
  - Professional Bowlers Association
- PBB – (p) PolyBrominated Biphenyl
- PBC
  - (i) Push Button Connect, a WPS method
  - (i) Playback Control, a feature on Video CD and Super Video CD
- PBCK – (i) Problem Between Chair and Keyboard (computer help desk in-joke)
- PBD – (p) PolyButaDiene
- PBDE – (i) PolyBrominated Diphenyl Ether
- PBI – (p) PolyBenzImidazole
- PBIS - Positive Behavior Interventions and Supports
- PBN – (p) PolyButylene Naphthalate
- PBOH – (i) Please Become Old History
- PBR
  - (i) Pabst Blue Ribbon (beer brand)
  - Professional Bull Riders
- PBS
  - (i) Pharmaceutical Benefits Scheme (Australia)
  - Public Broadcasting Service (U.S.)
  - Public Broadcasting Services (Malta)
- PBRT - may stand for: Physically Based Raytracing, an open source software rendering system for physically correct image synthesis.
- PBT – (p) PolyButylene Terephthalate
- PBX – (p) Private Branch eXchange (company phone system)

== PC ==
- pC – (s) picocoulomb
- PC
  - (s) petacoulomb
  - U.S. Pacific Islands Trust Territory (ISO 3166 digram; obsolete 1986)
  - (i) Personal computer
  - Player Character (roleplaying)
  - Politically Correct / Political Correctness
  - post cibum (Latin, "after meals")
- PCAS – (i) Planet-Crossing Asteroid Survey
- PCB – see entry
- PCC
  - (i) NATO Partnership Coordination Cell
  - Posterior Cingulate Cortex
  - Pre-Command Course
  - Presidents Conference Committee
- PCCB – (i) Porsche Ceramic Composite Brake
- PCCIP – (i) President's Commission on Critical Infrastructure Protection
- PCE – (p) PerChlorEthylene
- PCI
  - (s) U.S. Pacific Islands Trust Territory (ISO 3166 trigram; obsolete 1986)
  - (i) Peripheral Component Interconnect (computer bus)
- PCIe – (i) Peripheral Component Interconnect Express (computer bus)
- PCL – (i) Passive Coherent Location
- PCMCIA – (i) Personal Computer Memory Card International Association (People Can't Memorise Computer-Industry Acronyms)
- PCN – (s) Pitcairn Islands (ISO 3166 trigram)
- PCP
  - (p) phencyclidine
  - Pneumocystis jiroveci pneumonia (formerly Pneumocystis carinii)
  - (i) Probabilistically Checkable Proof
- PCPI – Physician Consortium for Performance Improvement (AMA)
- PCR – (i) Polymerase chain reaction
- PCSSD - (p) Pulaski County Special School District
- PCT
  - (i) Pacific Crest Trail
  - Patent Cooperation Treaty
- PCTE
  - (i) Portable Common Tool Environment
  - (i) Punjab College of Technical Education
- PCZ – (s) Panama Canal Zone (ISO 3166 trigram; obsolete 1980)

== PD ==
- Pd – (s) Palladium
- PD
  - (i) per diem (Latin: (calculated) by the day)
  - Point of Departure
  - Police Department
  - Postal District
  - Potential Difference
  - Principal Deputy
  - Privatdozent
  - Public domain
- PD – (i) Product Director—Example: CERDEC Product Director C4ISR and Network Modernization
- PDA
  - (i) Personal Digital Assistant
  - Predicted Drift Angle
  - Public Display of Affection
  - Push-Down Automaton
- PDD
  - (i) Past Due Date
  - Presidential Decision Directive
- PDF
  - (i) Panama[nian] Defense Forces (abolished 1990)
  - Portable Document Format
  - Principal Direction of Fire
- PDG
  - (i) President Director General
  - Product Development Group
- PDL
  - (i) Premier Development League, a former name of the U.S. minor soccer league now known as USL League Two
  - Pure Dumb Luck (Texan punk band)
- PDN – (i) Pull-Down Network
- PDP
  - (i) Programmable Data Processor
  - Performance Development Plan
- PDQ
  - (i) Pre-Defined Queries (Siebel packages)
  - Pretty Damn Quick
- PDRY – (i) People's Democratic Republic of Yemen (obsolete since 1990)
- PDT – (i) Pacific Daylight [Saving] Time (UTC-7 hours)
- PDU
  - (i) Police Dog Unit
  - Power Distribution Unit
  - Protocol Data Unit
- PDVSA – (a/i) Petróleos de Venezuela, S.A. (Spanish, "Venezuelan Petroleum Company")

== PE ==
- PE – Professional Engineer
- PE – (s) Ice Pellets (old style METAR Code) – Peru (ISO 3166 and FIPS 10-4 country code digram) – (i) Physical Education – Premature Ejaculation – (s) Prince Edward Island (postal code) – Price to Earning ratio (used for equity shares) – Plant Extract
- PEBCAC – (a) Problem Exists Between Chair and Computer (IT help desk in-joke)
- PEBKAC – (a) Problem Exists Between Keyboard and Chair (ditto)
- PEEK – (i) PolyEtherEtherKetone
- PEET – (a) Partnerships for Enhancing Expertise in Taxonomy
- PEGIDA – (a) Patriotische Europäer gegen die Islamisierung des Abendlandes (German, "Patriotic Europeans Against the Islamization of the West")
- PEI – (i) Prince Edward Island – PolyEtherImide
- PEK – (i) PolyEtherKetone
- PEMDAS - The order of operations in math (Parentheses, Exponents, Division, Multiplication, Addition, Subtraction)
- PEN
  - (s) Peruvian sol (ISO 4217 currency code)
  - (i) Poets, Essayists and Novelists, the original meaning of the initialism of the organization now known as PEN International
  - PolyEthylene Naphthalate
- PEO – (i) Παγκύπρια Εργατική Ομοσπονδία (Greek for "Pancyprian Federation of Labour") – Philanthropic Educational Organization – PolyEthylene Oxide – Professional Employer Organization – Professional Engineers Ontario
- PEPFAR – (a) President's Emergency Plan For AIDS Relief
- PER – (s) Peru (ISO 3166 trigram)
- perl – (a) usually lower case Practical Extraction and Report Language
- PERM - Program Electronic Review Management
- PES – (i) PolyEtherSulfone
- PEST – (a) UK Public Engagement with Science and Technology
- PET – (a/i) Personal Electronic Transactor – Pierre Elliott Trudeau – Positron Emission Tomography (as in PET scan) – PolyEthylene Terephthalate (plastic) – (a) Preliminary English Test
- PETA – (a/i) pentaerythritol triacrylate – People Eating Tasty Animals – People for the Ethical Treatment of Animals
- PETE – (i) PolyEthyleneTErephthalate
- PETP – (i) PolyEthyleneTerePhthalate

== PF ==
- pF – (s) picofarad
- PF
  - (s) French Polynesia (ISO 3166 digram)
  - petafarad
  - (i) Phenol Formaldehyde (resin)
  - Power forward, a player position in Australian rules football, basketball, and ice hockey
- PFD – (i) Permanent Fund Dividend = personal flotation device
- PFE – (i) Permanent Forest Estate
- PFLAG – (p) Parents, Families and Friends of Lesbians and Gays ("pee-flag")
- PFIY – (a) Please Fix it Yourself ("pee-fiy")
- PFO – (i) Pissed, Fell Over (medical diagnosis in-joke)
- PfP – (i) Partnership for Peace
- PFW
  - (i) Pro Football Weekly (magazine and website covering the National Football League)
  - Purdue University Fort Wayne

== PG ==
- pg – (s) picogram
- Pg – (s) petagram
- PG –
  - (i) propylene glycol
  - (s) Papua New Guinea (ISO 3166 digram)
  - (i) Parental Guidance (movie rating)
  - Point guard (basketball position)
- PG-13 (disambiguation) – (p) (movie rating)
- PGCE – (p) Postgraduate Certificate in Education
- PGD – (i) Pre-implantation Genetic Diagnosis
- PG&E – (i) Pacific Gas & Electric
- PGENI – (i) Pharmaco-Genetics for Every Nation Initiative
- PGH – (i) Pre-implantation Genetic Haplotyping
- PGK – (s) Papua New Guinea kina (ISO 4217 currency code)
- PGM – (i) Precision-Guided Munition
- PGP – (i) Pretty Good Privacy

== PH ==
- pH
  - (s) parts of hydrogen (acidity/alkalinity index)
  - picohenry
- PH
  - (i) Passive Homing (missile guidance system)
  - (s) petahenry
  - Philippines (ISO 3166 digram)
  - (i) Probability of Hit
  - Professional hunter (abbreviation used mostly in East and Southern Africa)
  - Public Health
  - Purple Heart
  - (i) Pakatan Harapan (Malaysia)
- PHA
  - (p) PolyHydroxyAlkanoate
  - (i) Potentially hazardous asteroid
- Ph.D. – (p) Philosophiæ Doctor (Latin, "Doctor of Philosophy")
- PHEV – (i) Plug-in hybrid electric vehicle
- PHF
  - (i) Paired helical filaments (aggregations of tau proteins in the human brain associated with tauopathy)
  - Potentially Hazardous Food
  - Premier Hockey Federation (defunct North American women's ice hockey league)
- PHL – (s) Philippines (ISO 3166 trigram)
- PHQ - Patient Health Questionnaire
- PHP
  - (s) Philippine peso (ISO 4217 currency code)
  - (i) PHP: Hypertext Preprocessor (originally Personal Home Page (Tools))

== PI ==
- pi – (s) Pāli language (ISO 639-1 code)
- Pi – (s) Pebi
- PI
  - (i) PolyImide
  - PolyIsoprene
  - Private Investigator
- PIB – (i) PolyIsoButylene
- PIC – (i) Person In Charge
- PICNIC – (a) Problem In Chair Not In Computer
- PICS – (i) Private Investment Capital Subscription
- PID
  - (i) Pelvic inflammatory disease
  - (p) Plan Identification Number
  - Positive Identification
  - Procedural Identification
  - (i) Procurement Identification Description
- PIDOOMA – (a/i) Pulled It Directly Out Of My Ass
- PIF – (a/i) Partners in Flight
- PIG – (a) Pipeline Inspection Gauge
- PIGS (also PIIGS or PIIGGS) – (a) Portugal, Italy, Greece, Spain; PIIGS if including Ireland; PIIGGS if including the United Kingdom (Great Britain)
- PIGS – Passenger Inert Guidance Systems – Movable tape barrier, typically used on airport aprons to guide passengers to/from their aircraft avoiding danger areas.
- PIM
  - (a/i) Parameterized Ionospheric Model
  - Path of Intended Motion
  - Pediatric Index of Mortality
  - Personal Information Manager/Management
  - Presence and Interworking Mobility
  - Processor-In-Memory
  - Program Integration Manager
  - Protocol Independent Multicast
- PIN – (a) Personal Identification Number
- PINF – (i) People In Need Foundation (Czech charitable organisation)
- PIPA – (a/i) Program on International Policy Attitudes
- PIR – (i) Priority Intelligence Requirement
- PIRA – (a) Provisional Irish Republican Army
- PIREPS – (p) Pilot Reports
- PITA – (a) Pain In The Ass
- P.I. - Philippines Islands
- PITS - Person In The Seat. A common problem as to why a computer is not working properly. It is a PITS issue.

== PJ ==
- pJ – (s) picojoule
- PJ – (s) petajoule
- PJHQ – (p) Permanent Joint Headquarters
- PJs – (p) Pajamas ("pee-jayz")

== PK ==
- K – (s) picokelvin
- PK – (s) Pakistan (ISO 3166 and FIPS 10-4 country code digram) – petakelvin – (i) Player Kill[er] – Probability of Kill – (p) PolyKetone – (i) Pulemet Kalashnikova (Russian ПК пулемет Калашникова, "Machinegun Kalashnikov")
- PKA – (i) previously known as – professionally known as
- PKE – (i) Partnership of Kindermusik Educators
- PKI – (i) public key infrastructure (cryptography)
- PKM – (i) Pulemet Kalashnikova Modernizirovanniy (Russian ПКМ пулемет Калашникова модернизированный, "Machinegun Kalashnikov Modernised")
- PKMS – (i) Pulemet Kalashnikova Modernizirovanniy Stepanova (Russian ПКМС пулемет Калашникова модернизированный Степанова, "Machinegun Kalashnikov Modernised Stepanova")
- PKMT – (i) Pulemet Kalashnikova Modernizirovanniy Tankoviy (Russian ПКМТ пулемет Калашникова модернизированный танковый, "Machinegun Kalashnikov Modernised Tank") (a.k.a. PKTM)
- PKR
  - (s) Pakistani rupee (ISO 4217 currency code)
  - (i) People's Justice Party (Malaysia)
- PKT – (i) Pulemet Kalashnikova Tankoviy (Russian ПКТ пулемет Калашникова танковый, "Machinegun Kalashnikov Tank")
- PKTM – (i) Pulemet Kalashnikova Tankoviy Modernizirovanniy (Russian ПКТМ пулемет Калашникова танковый модернизированный, "Machinegun Kalashnikov Tank Modernised") (a.k.a. PKMT)
- PKU – (p) Phenylketonuria

== PL ==
- pl – (s) Polish language (ISO 639-1 code)
- pL – (s) picolitre
- PL
  - (s) Ice Pellets (new style METAR Code)
  - (s) petalitre
  - (i) Phase Line (Co-ordination Line)
  - (s) Poland (ISO 3166 and FIPS 10-4 country code digram)
- PLA
  - (i) People's Liberation Army (Chinese military forces)
  - Programmable logic array
- PLAF
  - (a/i) People's Liberation Armed Forces
  - Pluggable look and feel
  - Product Line Architecture Framework
- PLAID – (p) Precision Location and Identification
- PLB – (i) Personal Locator Beacon
- PLC – (i) Public Limited Company (British)
- PLCC – (i) Plastic Leaded Chip Carrier (electronics)
- PLD – (i) Probable Line of Deployment
- PLEBS – (i) People Lacking Everyday Basic Skills
- PLF – (i) Parachute Landing Fall
- PLGR – (a) Precision Lightweight GPS Receiver ("plugger")
- pli – (s) Pāli language (ISO 639-2 code)
- PLI
  - (i) Position Location Information
  - Practising Law Institute
  - Private Lands Initiative
  - Professional Liability Insurance
- PLIF – (a) Planar Laser-Induced Fluorescence
- PLK – (i) Polska Liga Koszykówki (Polish, "Polish Basketball League")
- PLKK – (i) Polska Liga Koszykówki Kobiet (Polish, "Polish Women's Basketball League"), former name of the league now known as Basket Liga Kobiet
- PLL
  - (i) Phase-Locked Loop (electronics)
  - Premier Lacrosse League
- PLM – (i) Polarized Light Microscope/Microscopy
- PLMBA - (i) Phospholipid Bilayer Microarray
- Pln – (p) Platoon
- PLN – (s) Polish zloty (ISO 4217 currency code)
- PLO – (i) Palestine Liberation Organization
- PLOKTA – (a) Press Lots Of Keys To Abort
- PLP – (i) Platonic Life Partner
- PLS
  - (i) Palletized Loading System
  - Personal Locator System
- PLUTO – (a) Pipe Line Under The Ocean
- PLW – (s) Palau (ISO 3166 trigram)

== PM ==
- pm – (s) picometre
- Pm – (s) petametre – Promethium
- PM – (s) Panama (FIPS 10-4 country code) – (i) Perry Mason – Phase Modulation – Post Meridiem (Latin "after noon") – Prime Minister – Project Manager – (s) Saint Pierre and Miquelon (ISO 3166 digram)
- PMC – (i) Primary Motor Cortex
- PMCS – (i) Partial Mission Capable Supply (SM&R code) – Power Management Control System – Professional Military Comptroller School
- PME – (i) Professional Military Education
- PMHT – (i) Pardon My Hashtag (Also #PMHT)
- PMI – (i) Positive Material Identification
- PMID – (p) PubMed Identifier
- PMMA – (i) PolyMethylMethAcrylate
- PMO — Principal Medical Officer (UK, Canada, India, and Ireland)
- PMOS – (i/a) P-type/Positive Metal-Oxide-Semiconductor transistor ("pee-moss")
- PMS – (i) Premenstrual Syndrome
- PMSC – (i) NATO Political-Military Steering Committee on Partnership for Peace
- PMSL – (i) Piss Myself Laughing (Internet shorthand)
- PMT - Premenstrual Tension (UK) (see Premenstrual Syndrome)

== PN ==
- pN – (s) piconewton
- PN
  - (s) petanewton
  - Pitcairn Islands (ISO 3166 diagram)
  - (i) Perikatan Nasional (Malaysia)
- PNAC – (i) Project for the New American Century
- PNC
  - (i) Palestinian National Council
  - Palmerston North City (cf. PNC, a New Zealand rapper from this city)
  - Parti nationaliste chrétien, defunct Quebec political party
  - Pittsburgh National Corporation, one of the two companies that merged into today's PNC Financial Services
  - Provident National Corporation, the other company that merged into PNC Financial Services
- PNF – (i) Pilot Not Flying (aviation)
- PNG
  - (s) Papua New Guinea (ISO 3166 trigram)
  - (i) Portable Network Graphics
- PNP
  - Parti national populaire, defunct Quebec political party
  - (i) Partido Nuevo Progresista
  - Plug 'N' Play/Pray
  - Positive Negative Positive
- PNS – (s) Pensacola, Florida (IATA airport code)
- PNVS – (i) Pilot Night Vision Sensor
- PNH
  - (i) Paroxysmal nocturnal hemoglobinuria
  - Police Nationale d'Haïti (French, "National Police of Haiti")

== PO ==
- Po – (s) Polonium
- PO
  - (s) Dust Devil (METAR Code)
  - (i) per os (Latin, "by mouth")
  - (s) Portugal (FIPS 10-4 country code)
- PO – (i) Post Office
- PO – (i) Purchase Order
- POCD – (i) Post-Operative Cognitive Dysfunction
- pod – (a) Plain Old Documentation
- POD
  - (i) Payable on Death (banking term, and the full name of American metal band P.O.D.)
  - Point of divergence (alternate or counterfactual history)
  - Port of Debarkation
- POE – (a) Perl Object Environment – (b) Port Of Embarkation (c) Polyol Ester (d) Power Over Ethernet
- POETS – (a) Portable Occultation, Eclipse, and Transit electronic-camera System
- POFF – (a) Plain Old Flat File
- POG – (a) Passionfruit, Orange and Guava
- POGO – (a) Project On Government Oversight
- POI
  - (i) Program Of Instruction
  - (i) Place of Interest
  - (i) Point of Interest
  - (i) Person of Interest
- POK – (a/i) Plane Of Knowledge
- pol – (s) Polish language (ISO 639-2 code)
- POL
  - (i) Petroleum, Oils and Lubricants
  - (s) Poland (ISO 3166 trigram)
- POLAD – (p) Political Advice
- POM
  - (i) Program Objective Memorandum
  - PolyOxyMethylene
- POMDP – (i) Partially observable Markov decision process
- POP
  - (a/i) Point of Presence
  - Post Office Protocol
  - Progesterone Only Pill
- por – (s) Portuguese language (ISO 639-2 code)
- POR
  - (s) Portugal (FIFA and IOC trigram, but not ISO 3166)
  - (i) Proposed Operational Requirement
- POS
  - (a/i) Point Of Sale terminal (retail industry transaction computers)
  - (i) Piece Of Shit
  - Position
- POSH – (a) Port Outbound Starboard Home (alleged)
- POSIWID – The purpose of a system is what it does
- POTC o PotC – (a) Pirates of the Caribbean
- POSSLQ – Person of the Opposite Sex Sharing Living Quarters
- POT – (a/i) Plane Of Tranquility
- POTS
  - (a) Plain Old Telephone Service (cf. PANS)
  - Postural orthostatic tachycardia syndrome
- POV – (i) Point of view / Point of vision
- POW – (i) Prisoner of war

== PP ==
- pp
  - pages, especially in references, e.g. "A. U. Thor, Title, Journal X, Vol. 1, no. 2 (2010) pp. 13-42."
- PP
  - (s) Papua New Guinea (FIPS 10-4 country code)
  - (i) Passage Point
  - per procurationem (Latin, "by proxy")
- PPA
  - (i) Parahippocampal Place Area
  - PolyPhthalAmide
- PPASC – (i) (U.S.) Plans and Program Analysis Support Center
- PPASSCCATAG - (a) "Proud Parents Against Singles, Seniors, Childless Couples And Teens And Gays", a fictional group formed by Marge Simpson
- PPCLI – (i) Princess Patricia's Canadian Light Infantry (regiment)
- PPG
  - (i) Pittsburgh Plate Glass (the original name of the company now known as PPG Industries)
  - The Powerpuff Girls
- PPL
  - (i) Pakistan Petroleum Limited
  - Pay per lead (marketing)
  - Pennsylvania Power & Light, former name of the U.S. utility company now known as PPL
  - Pfadfinder und Pfadfinderinnen Liechtensteins (German, "Scouts and Guides of Liechtenstein")
  - Phonographic Performance Limited (UK performing rights organisation)
- PPLI – (i) Precise Participant Location & Identification
- ppm – (i) Parts Per Million
- PPM – (i) Project Planning and Management
- PPO – (i) PolyPhenylene Oxide
- PPP
  - (i) Point-to-Point Protocol
  - Purchasing Power Parity
- PPQ – (i) Pulses Per Quarter (used in music programming, sequencers)
- PPQN – (i) Pulses Per Quarter Note (ditto)
- PPQT – (i) Pre-Production Qualification Test
- PPS
  - (i) post postscriptum
  - Precise/Precision Positioning Service (GPS)
  - PolyPhenylene Sulfide
- PPV – (a) Pay-per-view

== PQ ==
- PQ
  - (s) Province of Québec (obsolete postal code, replaced by QC)
  - (i) Parti Québécois

== PR ==
- Pr – (i) Pastor or Priest
- Pr – (s) Praseodymium
- PR
  - (i) Public Relations
  - (s) Puerto Rico (postal symbol; ISO 3166 digram)
- Prb – (i) Presbyter
- PRBO – (i) Point Reyes Bird Observatory
- PRC – (i) People's Republic of China
- PRD – (i) CERDEC Product Realization Directorate
- PRFG – (s) Partial Fog (METAR Code)
- PRI – (s) Puerto Rico (ISO 3166 trigram)
- Prinair - Puerto Rico International Airlines
- PRK – (s) Democratic People's Republic of Korea (ISO 3166 trigram)
- PRM – (i) Personnel Readiness Management
- PRN – (i) pro re nata (Latin, "for the emergency", "as needed")
- PRT
  - (s) Portugal (ISO 3166 trigram)
  - (i) Provincial Reconstruction Team
- PRY – (s) Paraguay (ISO 3166 trigram)

== PS ==
- ps
  - (s) Pashto language (ISO 639-1 code)
  - picosecond
- pS – (s) picosiemens
- Ps – (s) petasecond
- PS
  - (s) Palestinian Territory, Occupied (ISO 3166 digram)
  - (i) Personnel Services
  - (s) petasiemens
  - (i) post scriptum (Latin, "written after")
  - Power Steering
  - Power Supply
  - Public School
- PooS – Poo Sniffer (Internet shorthand)
- PSA
  - Pacific Southwest Airlines
  - (i) Paralysis Society of America
  - Pharmaceutical Society of Australia
  - Pressure-Sensitive Adhesive
  - Production Services Association
  - Prostate Specific Antigen
  - Public Service Announcement
  - Public Service Association
- PSC
  - (i) Personal service corporation
  - Primary Somatosensory Cortex
- PSE
  - (s) Palestinian Territory, Occupied (ISO 3166 trigram)
  - (i) Precision Shooting Equipment, the expanded name of PSE Archery
- PSG
  - (i) Pacific Seabird Group
  - Paris Saint-Germain
- PSI - (i) Pounds per square inch
- PSI – (a/i) Portable Source Initiative
- PSO
  - (i) Peace Support Operations
  - Primary Standardisation Office (ABCA)
  - Protocol Supporting Organization (of the ICANN)
- PSS – (i) Personnel System Support
- PST – (i) Pacific Standard Time (UTC−8 hours)
- PSU – (i) Pennsylvania State University
- PSV
  - (i) Philips Sport Vereniging (Dutch for "Philips Sports Union")
  - Public Service Vehicle
- PsyOp – (p) Psychological Operations

== PT ==
- pt – (s) Portuguese language (ISO 639-1 code)
- pT – (s) picotesla
- Pt – (s) Platinum
- PT – (s) petatesla – (i) Physical Training (in the Army) – (s) Portugal (ISO 3166 digram)
- PTA – (i) Parent-Teacher Association
- PTAL – (i) Public Transport Accessibility Level
- PTAN –
  - (i) Precision Terrain Aided Navigation
  - (a) (pronounced P-tan) Provider Transaction Access Number
- PTCAS - Physical Therapy Centralized Application System
- PTES - (i) People's Trust for Endangered Species
- PTFE – (i) PolyTetraFluoroEthylene
- PTI – (i) Pardon the Interruption
- PTL – (p) Patrol – (i) Primary Target Line
- PTO – (i) Patent and Trademark Office – (i) please turn over (written at the bottom of a double-sided page)
- PTSD – (i) Posttraumatic stress disorder
- PTUI – (a/i) Plain-Text User Interface ("pa-too-ey") (cf CLI)

== PU ==
- Pu – (s) Plutonium
- PU
  - (s) Guinea-Bissau (FIPS 10-4 country code)
  - (i) Polyurethane
  - (s) United States Miscellaneous Pacific Islands (ISO 3166 digram; obsolete 1986)
- Pub – (p) Publication
- PUG – (a/i) PET Users Group
- PUN – (a/i) Pull-Up Network
- PUP – (a/i) Pull-Up Point
- PUR – (s) Puerto Rico (IOC and FIFA trigram, but not ISO 3166)
- pus – (s) Pashto language (ISO 639-2 code)
- PUS – (s) United States Miscellaneous Pacific Islands (ISO 3166 trigram; obsolete 1986)

== PV ==
- pV – (s) picovolt
- PV – (s) petavolt
- PVC
  - (i) Permanent Virtual Circuit
  - PolyVinyl Chloride
  - Premature Ventricular Contraction
  - Primary Visual Cortex
- PvE – (i) Player versus Environment
- PvP – (i) Player versus Player
- PVR – (i) Personal Video Recorder
- PvZ – (i) Plants vs. Zombies

== PW ==
- pW – (s) picowatt
- PW
  - (s) Palau (postal symbol; ISO 3166 digram)
  - petawatt
- PWA – (i) Pirates With Attitude
- PWBA – (p) Pension and Welfare Benefits Administration
- PwC – (i) PricewaterhouseCoopers (international accounting firm)
- PWC – (i) PieceWise Constant (describing a mathematical function)
- PWHL
  - (i) Professional Women's Hockey League, a North American women's ice hockey league
  - Provincial Women's Hockey League, a junior ice hockey league operating in the Canadian province of Ontario
- PWL – (i) PieceWise Linear (describing a mathematical function)
- PWLC – (i) PieceWise Linear and Concave/Convex (describing a mathematical function)
- PWM - (i) Pulse-width Modulation
- PWP – (i) Plot, What Plot? / Porn Without Plot (denotes plotless, um, "feel-good" stories in online fiction, especially fanfic or erotic fiction)
- PWR – (i) Pressurized Water Reactor
- PWV – (i) Pretoria-Witwatersrand-Vereeniging, the original name for the South African province now known as Gauteng, and still used to refer to the metropolitan agglomeration at the core of the province

== PX ==
- PX – (p) Post eXchange

== PY ==
- PY – (s) Paraguay (ISO 3166 digram) – Person-Year – (i) Portsmouth yardstick
- PYF – (s) French Polynesia (ISO 3166 trigram)
- PYG – (s) Paraguayan guaraní (ISO 4217 currency code)
- PYMWYMI – (a) Put Your Money Where Your Mouth Is

== PZ ==
- PZ – (s) Panama Canal Zone (ISO 3166 digram; obsolete 1980) – (i) Pickup Zone
