= Tyrosine ammonia-lyase =

Tyrosine ammonia lyase

Identifiers
- EC no.: 4.3.1.23

Databases
- IntEnz: IntEnz view
- BRENDA: BRENDA entry
- ExPASy: NiceZyme view
- KEGG: KEGG entry
- MetaCyc: metabolic pathway
- PRIAM: profile
- PDB structures: RCSB PDB PDBe PDBsum
Search
- PMC: articles
- PubMed: articles
- NCBI: proteins

Tyrosine ammonia lyase (EC 4.3.1.23, L-tyrosine ammonia-lyase, TAL or Tyrase) is an enzyme in the natural phenols biosynthesis pathway. It transforms L-tyrosine into p-coumaric acid.

$\xrightarrow{TAL}$ + Ammonia + H^{+}

L-tyrosine = trans-p-hydroxycinnamate + NH_{3}

== See also ==
- EC 4.3.1.24 (phenylalanine ammonia-lyase)
- EC 4.3.1.25 (phenylalanine/tyrosine ammonia-lyase)
