= PTO =

PTO may refer to:

== Sports ==
- Phoenix Thunderbirds Open, a golf tournament on the LPGA Tour from 1962 to 1965
- Professional Triathletes Organisation, an organisation that representing non-drafting professional triathletes
- Professional tryout, a type of professional ice hockey contract

== Entertainment ==
- P.T.O. (video game), a war strategy simulation series by Koei based on the World War II events
- "P:T:O:", a track from the 1977 Klaus Schulze album Body Love
- The Phantom of the Opera (adaptations), or the Phantom character from any of these
- Please Turn Over, a 1959 British comedy film
- Promenade Theatre Orchestra, a former English quartet

== Transportation ==
- Peace Train Organisation, a campaign group set up in response to the repeated bombing of the Dublin to Belfast railway line
- Power take-off, one of several methods for taking power from a power source
- Public Transport Operator

== Communication ==
- Permeability tuned oscillator, an electronic circuit; see 75A-4 and KWS-1#PTOsc
- "Please turn over", written at the bottom of a double-sided document; see List of acronyms: P#PT
- Public Telecommunications Operator, a service provider of telecommunications services such as telephony and data communications access
- Zoʼé language (ISO 639-3 code: pto)

== Other uses ==
- Pacific Theatre of Operations (disambiguation)
- Paid time off, time an employee can draw from to take time off from work
- Parent teacher organization, organization that consists of parents, teachers and school staff
- Parietal-temporal-occipital, an area of the brain
- Patent and Trademark Office (disambiguation), a government office that handles the issuing of both patents and trademarks
- Peeled tail-on shrimp, in shrimp marketing
- Permission to officiate, a form of license to undertake ecclesiastical duties within the Church of England
- Proof-theoretic ordinal, an ordinal assigned to mathematical theories to measure their strength
