= PFD =

PFD may refer to:

== Science, technology, and medicine ==
- Personal flotation device
- Pelvic floor dysfunction
- Phase frequency detector in electronics
- Primary flight display, in an aircraft
- Probability of Failure on Demand, see Safety integrity level#Certification
- Process flow diagram, in process engineering
- Prepared for dyeing
- Professional Disc, recordable optical disc format
- PFD allowance in work systems
- Partial fraction decomposition
- Perfluorodecalin, a molecule capable of dissolving large amounts of gas
- Pediatric feeding disorder, a unifying diagnostic term encompassing medical, nutrition, feeding skill, and psychosocial domains

== Organizations ==
- Philadelphia Fire Department
- Pigespejdernes Fællesråd Danmark, Guiding federation of Denmark
- Peters, Fraser & Dunlop, an English literary and talent agency

== Other uses ==
- Permanent Fund Dividend of Alaska Permanent Fund
- A prevention of future deaths report issued by a coroner in the United Kingdom

== See also ==
- PDF (disambiguation)
