= Pamela =

Pamela commonly refers to:

- Pamela; or, Virtue Rewarded, a novel written by Samuel Richardson in 1740
- Pamela (name), a given name and, rarely, a surname.

Pamela may also refer to:

== Arts, entertainment, and media ==
=== Music ===
- Pamela Spence, a Turkish pop-rock singer, known by her stage name "Pamela"
- "Pamela Pamela", a song recorded by Wayne Fontana that reached number 11 in the UK Singles Chart in 1967
- "Pamela" (song), a 1988 hit song for the band Toto
- "Pamella", a song by Remmy Ongala from the album Songs for the Poor Man
- "Pamela Wan", a song composed by Vhong Navarro in 2004, inspired by the movie Otso-Otso Pamela-Mela-Wan

=== Other entertainment and media ===
- Pamela (film), a 1945 French film
- Pamela, A Love Story, a 2023 Netflix documentary about Pamela Anderson
- Una donna da guardare, a 1990 Italian erotic movie
- P.A.M.E.L.A., a first-person survival video game

== Other ==
- MSC Pamela, a container ship launched in 2005
- Pamela (butterfly), a butterfly genus
- Perrhybris pamela, a butterfly with the common name Pamela
- Pamela hat, a straw hat named after Richardson's heroine, worn 1790s–1870s
- Super Typhoon Pamela, a typhoon in 1976
- A launch platform of the Mistral missile

== Acronyms ==
- PAMELA Project, Process for Advanced Management of End of-Life-Aircraft
- Payload for Antimatter Matter Exploration and Light-nuclei Astrophysics, astrophysical satellite module
- Pedestrian Accessibility and Movement Environment Laboratory, artificial pavement at a research center at University College London

== See also ==
- Pam (disambiguation)
