= PSE =

PSE may refer to:

== Companies and organizations ==
=== Stock exchanges ===
- Pacific Stock Exchange, stock exchange in USA
- Pakistan Stock Exchange, stock exchange of Pakistan
- Palestine Securities Exchange, stock exchange in Palestine
- Philippine Stock Exchange, stock exchange in Philippines
- Prague Stock Exchange, stock exchange in the Czech Republic
- Pune Stock Exchange, stock exchange in India

=== Other ===
- Paksi SE, a Hungarian football club based in Paks, Hungary
- Paris School of Economics, a French academic foundation in Paris
- Partido Socialista de Euskadi, a Basque Party
- Party of European Socialists (French: Parti socialiste européen)
- Group of the Party of European Socialists, a parliamentary group in the European Parliament 1993–2009
- Pegula Sports and Entertainment, American sports and entertainment holding company based in Buffalo, New York
- Philosophical Society of England
- Pi Sigma Epsilon, a professional fraternal organization in sales, marketing, and management
- Polskie Sieci Elektroenergetyczne, an electricity transmission system operator in Poland
- PSE Archery, an archery bow and crossbow supply company
- Puget Sound Energy, an energy utility company in Washington state, USA

== Education ==
- Personal and social education, a component of the state school curriculum in Wales and Scotland
- Personal, social, health and economic education, an element of the state school curriculum in England and Northern Ireland
- Post secondary education or higher education

== Places ==
- State of Palestine, by ISO 3166-1 country code
- PSE, railway station code of Pasar Senen railway station in Jakarta, Indonesia
- PSE, the three-letter National Rail station code for Pitsea railway station.
- PSE, the IATA and FAA LID airport code for Mercedita International Airport in Ponce, Puerto Rico.
- Stadion PSE, a stadium in Paks, Hungary

== Technology ==
- Packet Switching Exchange
- Page Size Extension, paging mechanism in computer microprocessor
  - PSE-36, a 36 bit extension of the mechanism
- Photoshop Elements, a consumer image manipulation program
- PlayStation Eye, a digital camera device for the PlayStation 3
- Power sourcing equipment, network devices that provide power in a Power over Ethernet setup
- PSE law, a Japanese standard for electrical appliance safety
- Problem solving environment, specialized computer software
- Process Systems Engineering, a category of engineering
- PSE law (Indonesia), a Indonesia Government policy.

== Science and medicine ==
- Passive Seismic Experiment, one of the Apollo Lunar Surface Experiments Package experiments
- Periodic System of Elements, a tabular arrangement of the chemical elements
- Photosensitive epilepsy, epilepsy seizures triggered by visual stimuli
- Picture superiority effect, a concept in cognitive psychology
- Plant Systematics and Evolution, an academic journal
- Point of Subjective Equality (PSE) as used in psychophysics discrimination experiments
- Portosystemic encephalopathy, a liver failure condition
- Present State Examination, tools created by WHO for diagnosing mental illness
- Probe Support Equipment, an element of the atmospheric entry probe Huygens
- Producer support estimate (formerly producer subsidy equivalent), a measure published by the OECD
- Pseudoephedrine, a medication

== Other ==
- Pidgin Sign English, a type of contact sign language
- Postal stationery envelope, a stamped envelope
- Public sector undertakings in India - a.k.a. Public Sector Enterprises in India
- Projet structurant de l'Est, a planned tramway system in Montreal, Canada

== See also ==
- TGV PSE, a French TGV train
- PSE meat, a carcass quality condition
