= PTAL =

PTAL may refer to:

- Public transport accessibility level, a method sometimes used in UK transport planning to assess the access level of geographical areas to public transport
- Phenylalanine/tyrosine ammonia-lyase, an enzyme
- Postgraduate Training Authorization Letter
