= PCTE =

PCTE can refer to:

- Portable Common Tool Environment, an ISO standard (ISO/IEC 13719) and ECMA standard (ECMA-149) for exchanging data between Computer-aided software engineering (CASE) tools
- Punjab College of Technical Education, a Management and technical education institution in Ludhiana, Punjab, India
- Communist Party of the Workers of Spain (Partido Comunista de los Trabajadores de España), a Spanish political party.
