= Posh =

Posh is today an informal adjective for "upper class". It may also refer to:

== Entertainment ==
- Posh (album), a 1980 album by Patrice Rushen
- "Posh!", a 1968 song from the musical Chitty Chitty Bang Bang
- Posh (2006 TV series), a 2006 Philippine television drama
- Posh (play), by the British playwright Laura Wade, first staged in 2010
  - The Riot Club, formerly titled Posh, a 2014 film adaptation of the play

== Computing ==
- Plain Old Semantic HTML, a term used by the microformat community to describe some uses of Semantic HTML
- Poshlib, the Portable Open Source Harness
- PowerShell, sometimes abbreviated PoSh

== Other ==
- Victoria Beckham (born 1974), singer nicknamed "Posh Spice" while she was a member of the Spice Girls
- Peterborough United F.C., an English football club, nicknamed "The Posh"
- Received Pronunciation, sometimes known as a "posh accent"
- Posh (Haganah unit), the commando arm of the Haganah during the 1936–1939 Arab revolt in Palestine
- Sexual Harassment of Women at Workplace (Prevention, Prohibition and Redressal) Act, 2013 - Indian law, also called and popular as Prevention Of Sexual Harassment (POSH)
- Polyolefin oligomeric saturated hydrocarbons

== See also ==
- Bacha posh, a cultural practice in parts of Afghanistan and Pakistan
- Pish Posh, a children's novel by Ellen Potter
- Sped-Posh, Siah-Posh and Safed-Posh, historic subdivisions of the Nuristani Afghani ethnic group
- Posch, a surname
