= PMI =

PMI may stand for:

== Computer science ==
- Pointwise mutual information, in statistics
- Privilege Management Infrastructure in cryptography
- Product and manufacturing information in CAD systems

== Companies ==
- Philip Morris International, American multinational tobacco company
- Picture Music International, former division of EMI that specialised in music video releases
- Precious Moments, Inc., American catalog order company
- Precision Monolithics, former American semiconductor company
- PMI Group, a holding company whose primary subsidiary is the PMI Mortgage Insurance Co

== Economics ==
- Passenger-mile, a unit of measurement
- Post-merger integration
- Private mortgage insurance or lenders mortgage insurance
- Purchasing Managers' Index, of business sentiment

== Organizations ==
- Pickleball Manitoba Inc., a Canadian provincial sport authority
- Plumbing Manufacturers International
- Project Management Institute
- Indonesian Red Cross Society (Indonesian: Palang Merah Indonesia

== Schools ==
- PMI Colleges, formerly the Philippine Maritime Institute
  - PMI Colleges Bohol, Tagbilaran City
- Pima Medical Institute, US

== Medicine ==
- The pulse at the point of maximum impulse (PMI) is the apex beat of the heart
- Post-mortem interval, the time since a death

== Technique ==
- Positive material identification of a metallic alloy
- Preventive maintenance inspection, USAF

== Other uses ==
- Palma de Mallorca Airport (IATA airport code PMI)
- Pointwise mutual information, measure in statistical probability theory
- US Presidential Management Internship, now Presidential Management Fellows Program
- President's Malaria Initiative, U.S. Government initiative to control and eliminate malaria
