= PGH =

PGH may refer to:

== Organisations ==
- Philadelphia General Hospital, in Philadelphia, Pennsylvania, US
- Philippine General Hospital, in Manila, the Philippines
- Piedmont Geriatric Hospital, in Burkeville, Virginia, US
- Pengrowth Energy Trust (New York Stock Exchange ticker symbol), a former Canadian energy company
- Produktionsgenossenschaft des Handwerks ("Craft production cooperative"), craft production cooperatives in East Germany

== Places ==
- Pittsburgh, Pennsylvania, US
  - Union Station (Pittsburgh), (station code)

== Science ==
- Placental growth hormone, a form of growth hormone
- Preimplantation genetic haplotyping, a clinical method in medicine
- Premature greying of hair

== Military ==
- A US Navy hull classification symbol: Patrol gunboat hydrofoil (PGH)
