= PCE =

PCE may stand for:

== Business and economics ==
- Personal consumption expenditure, or private consumption expenditure
- Personal consumption expenditures price index, a measure of inflation

== Chemistry and engineering ==
- PCE or eticyclidine, an illegal drug related to Phencyclidine (PCP)
- Tetrachloroethylene (perchloroethylene), widely used in dry-cleaning
- Polycarboxylate ethers, superplasticizers
- Pro-opiomelanocortin converting enzyme, an enzyme
- Pyrometric cone equivalent, measuring heat in the firing of pottery
- Power conversion efficiency, a near synonym for "Energy conversion efficiency" often used in the field of photovoltaics

== Computing ==
- Path computation element, a network element used for pathfinding
- Principle of computational equivalence, a concept developed by Stephen Wolfram published in the book A New Kind of Science
- PC Engine, a video game console developed by NEC and Hudson Soft

== Medicine ==
- Prenatal cocaine exposure, exposure of a fetus to cocaine when a pregnant woman uses the drug
- Eticyclidine, a dissociative anesthetic drug

== Organizations ==
- Paavai College of Engineering, Namakkal, Tamil Nadu, India
- Padmanava College of Engineering, Rourkela, an engineering college in Rourkela, Orissa state, India
- Parents for Choice in Education, an advocacy group in Utah, U.S.
- Parliamentary Commissioner for the Environment, New Zealand government agency

=== Political parties ===
==== Spain ====
- PCE, Communist Party of Spain or "Partido Comunista de España"
- PCE(i), Communist Party of Spain (International)(1975) or Partido Comunista de España(Internacional)
- PCE(m-l), Communist Party of Spain (Marxist–Leninist) or Partido Comunista de España (Marxista-Leninista)
- PCE(ML), Communist Party of Spain (Marxist–Leninist) (historical) or Partido Comunista de España (Marxista-Leninista)
- PCE(M-R), Workers' Party of Spain–Communist Unity or Partido de los Trabajadores de España–Unidad Comunista
- PCE(R), Communist Party of Spain (Reconstituted) or Partido Comunista de España (Reconstituido)

==== Other countries ====
- Parti Communautaire Européen, a political party in Belgium
- Partido Comunista del Ecuador, the Communist Party of Ecuador

== Other ==
- ISO 639:pce or Palaung language, spoken in Burma and neighboring countries
- Passenger car equivalent, a measure of traffic flow
- A US Navy hull classification symbol: Patrol craft escort (PCE)
- Power cost equalization, a state subsidy in Alaska
- Pardubice
