= PPQ =

PPQ may refer to:

- Partido Patria Querida (Beloved Fatherland Party), a political party in Paraguay
- Parts per quadrillion
- Pei language (ISO 639:ppq)
- Plant Protection and Quarantine, a program of the USDA (United States Department of Agriculture)
- Walther PPQ, semi-automatic pistol
- Kapiti Coast Airport (IATA: PPQ), New Zealand
- Pulses per quarter note, Music sequencing unit
- Piperaquine, an anti-malarial drug

== See also ==
- PPQA, process and product quality assurance
