= PHP (disambiguation) =

PHP is a free and open-source server-side scripting language.

PHP may also refer to:

== Organizations ==
- Primary Health Properties, a UK real estate investment trust
- PHP Institute, a Japanese think tank and publisher whose name stands for "Peace and Happiness through Prosperity"
- PHP Family, a Bangladeshi conglomerate
- People's Heritage Party, a political party in Ghana

== Places ==
- Pizza Hut Park, the former name of Toyota Stadium in Dallas, Texas, US
- Philip Municipal Airport (IATA and FAA LID), an airport in Philip, South Dakota, US

== Other uses ==
- Parallel History Project, a website with information about the Cold War
- Partial hospitalization program, a program used to treat mental illness and substance abuse
- Physician health program, monitoring programs for healthcare professionals with substance use disorders
- Penultimate hop popping, a function of certain routers in MPLS computer networks
- Percutaneous hepatic perfusion, a regionalized cancer treatment
- Pigeonhole principle, a fundamental mathematical principle
- Pulsating heat pipe, a heat-transfer device
- PHP pistol, a Croatian-made pistol
- PHP, the ISO 4217 currency code of the Philippine peso
