= Pira =

Pira or PIRA may refer to:

== Places ==
- Pira, Victoria, a locality in Australia
- Pira, Benin, a town
- Pira District, Huaraz Province, Peru
- Pira, Tarragona, Spain

== Organisations ==
- Physics Instructional Resource Association
- Provisional Irish Republican Army

== Weapons ==
- Pirah or pira, a wide-tipped sword from the Yakan people of the Philippines
- Pira, another name for the curving Talibong sword of the Visayan people of the Philippines
