= PDD (disambiguation) =

PDD often refers to Pervasive developmental disorder.

PDD may also refer to:

== Medicine ==
- Parkinson's disease dementia
- Penile dysmorphic disorder
- Persistent depressive disorder, also known as dysthymia
- Persons with developmental disabilities
- Prescribed daily dose
- Progressive diaphyseal dysplasia, also known as Camurati–Engelmann disease
- Proventricular dilatation disease, also known as "macaw wasting disease"

== Science ==
- Percentage depth dose curve, the absorbed radiation dose in a medium, varying with depth.
- Pulsed discharge detector, a type of gas chromatography ion detector
- New Zealand Fungarium (PDD), a national collection of dried fungi and plant diseases

== Computing and technology ==
- Physical device driver
- An alternative file extension for Portable Document Format files that are preferentially opened by Adobe Photoshop
- Process Driven Development, software development methodology
- Professional Disc for DATA or ProDATA, an optical disc format produced by Sony

== Business and law ==
- Pinduoduo, NASDAQ ticker PDD
- Project Design Document, a precise project description which serves as the basis for the Clean Development Mechanism (CDM) (project evaluation)
- Public Domain Day, an observance of when copyrights expire and works enter into the public domain

== Politics ==
- Partnership for Democracy and Development in Central America
- Party for Democratic Action (Partija za demokratsko delovanje), a political party in Serbia
- Presidential Decision Directive, a kind of national security directive from the Bill Clinton presidency

== Arts ==
- P. Diddy, rapper and entrepreneur
- Pas de deux, a type of ballet dance
- Pinky Dinky Doo, children's television series
- Please Don't Destroy, comedy group from New York City

== Others ==
- Punggol Digital District, a technologically advanced regional hub located in the Punggol new town, Singapore.
