= PVR =

PVR may refer to:

== Science and biology ==
- Plant variety rights, granted to a plant breeder
- CD155, a protein commonly known as the poliovirus receptor
- Post-void residual volume, the amount of urine retained in the bladder after a voluntary void
- Proliferative vitreoretinopathy, an eye disease
- Pulmonary vascular resistance, a type of resistance that must be overcome to create blood flow
- Petrol vapour recovery, a type of vapor recovery

== Companies ==
- Ranger Oil Corporation (formerly Penn Virginia Resources), a mining company
- PVR INOX (formerly PVR Cinemas), an Indian theatre chain

== Other ==
- Personal video recorder
- PVR, the IATA code of Licenciado Gustavo Díaz Ordaz International Airport in Puerto Vallarta, Mexico
- Peak Vehicle Requirement - a concept from transport planning
