= PCAS =

PCAS may refer to:

- Palomar Planet-Crossing Asteroid Survey, astronomical survey
- Patient-controlled analgesia methods
- Persistent Close Air Support
- Personal Carbon Allowances, a concept in Personal carbon trading
- Polytechnics Central Admissions System
- Portable Collision Avoidance System
- Postgraduate Certificate in Antarctic Studies at University of Canterbury
- Post-Cardiac Arrest Syndrome
