= PFE =

PFE may refer to:

- Pacific Fruit Express, a railroad refrigerator car leasing company
- Parathyroid hormone 1 receptor protein
- Partial fraction expansion
- Patriots for Europe, a political group in the European Parliament
- Pelvic floor exercise, also known as Kegel exercise
- Perfluoroether, a family of perfluoro polymer
- Permanent Fatal Error (a French post-rock band by Ulan Bator founder member)
- Pfizer Inc., New York Stock Exchange symbol PFE
- PolyGram Filmed Entertainment
- Portable Forth Environment, an Open source implementation of the Forth programming language
- Potential future exposure, the maximum expected credit exposure over a specified period of time
- Programmer's File Editor
- Product family engineering
- Proudly found elsewhere, the opposite predisposition of not invented here
