= PIB =

PIB may refer for:

== Music ==
- "Plug In Baby", a song by UK alternative rock band Muse
- Purified in Blood (PiB), a Norwegian band

== Organisations ==
- Papuan Infantry Battalion
- Press Information Bureau, Government of India

== Places ==
- Pir Ilahi Buksh Colony (PIB Colony), Sindh, Pakistan
- Hattiesburg–Laurel Regional Airport (IATA airport code: PIB)

== Science and technology ==
- Particle in a box (PIB), a model quantum mechanical system
- Pebibyte (PiB), a unit of digital information storage
- Pittsburgh compound B (PiB), chemical used in studying Alzheimer's Disease
- Polyisobutylene or polyisobutene, a synthetic rubber

== See also ==
- Píib or pib, a Mayan earth oven
- Permanent interest bearing shares (PIBS), a fixed-interest securities issued by UK building societies
- One of the two title characters in Pib and Pog, an animated short film created by Aardman Animations
