= PMOS =

PMOS and variations may refer to:

== Biology and medicine ==
- Polyendocrine metabolic ovarian syndrome (PMOS), a medical condition (formerly known as Polycystic ovary syndrome or PCOS)

== Computing and electronics ==
- p-channel MOSFET (pMOS)
  - PMOS logic
- postmarketOS (pmOS), a Linux operating system distro

== Government and military ==
- Prime Minister's Official Spokesperson (UK), in the British government
- Prime Minister of Sweden
- Primary Military Occupational Specialty, United States

== See also ==
- Project management offices (PMOs)
- PMO (disambiguation)
