= PDL =

PDL is an initialism for:

== Politics ==
- Democratic Liberal Party (Partidul Democrat Liberal), a former political party in Romania
- Labour Democratic Party (Partito Democratico del Lavoro), a former political party in Italy
- Pole of Freedoms (Polo delle Libertà), a former political alliance in Italy
- The People of Freedom (Il Popolo della Libertà), a former political party in Italy
- Free Destourian Party (Parti Destourien Libre), a current political party in Tunisia
- Die Linke (The Left), a current political party in Germany

== Science, mathematics and technology ==
=== Computing ===
- Page description language
- Perl Data Language and the data type it supports
- Program Design Language, a method of software construction
- Progressive download
- Public Documentation License, used with OpenOffice.org

=== Other uses in science and technology ===
- PDL, a former electrical hardware manufacturer in New Zealand now part of Schneider Electric
- Periodontal ligament
- Power door locks
- Preferred drug list, a US formulary categorization
- Propositional dynamic logic
- Pulsed dye laser
- Poundal, a unit of force (abbreviated pdl)
- Polarization Dependent Loss, see Polarization mode dispersion

== Sport ==
- Premier Development League, the former name of a developmental soccer league in the United States and Canada now known as USL League Two.
- Professional Development League, an English system of youth football leagues.

== Other uses ==
- Padalarang railway station, a railway station in Indonesia
- PDL BioPharma, formerly Protein Design Labs
- João Paulo II Airport (IATA code PDL)
- Person deprived of liberty, also known as a prisoner
- Previously developed land, see Brownfield land
- Ponta Delgada Airport
- Poorly Drawn Lines, an absurdist webcomic
- Portsmouth Direct line, a railway line in England
