= PFO =

PFO may refer to:

- Patent foramen ovale – a blood-flow pathway between a human heart's atriums, normally naturally closed after birth
- Personal Freedom Outreach – an Evangelical organization opposing cults
- Pittsburgh Film Office
- IATA code for Paphos International Airport
- Pathfinder Roleplaying Game – online version
- Persistent felony offender – a defendant accused under a three-strikes law
- Hong Kong's Public Finance Ordinance
