= PLIF =

PLIF may refer to:

- Planar laser-induced fluorescence, an optical diagnostic technique
- Posterior lumbar interbody fusion, a type of spinal fusion
- Plif, a character on the TV series Plonsters
- Plif, a Hoojib character in the Star Wars universe
