= Posch =

Posch is a surname of German origin. People with that name include:

- Alexander Posch (1890–1950), German painter
- Doris Posch (born 1973), Austrian track and road cyclist
- Fabian Posch (born 1988), Austrian handball player
- Inge Posch-Gruska (born 1962), Austrian politician
- Isaac Posch (1591–1622), Austrian composer and organist
- Krista Posch (born 1948), Italian-German television actress
- Luis Posch (active 1950s), Austrian luger
- Mario Posch (born 1967), Austrian football coach and former player
- Marion Posch (born 1972), Italian snowboarder
- Philipp Posch (born 1994), Austrian footballer
- Stefan Posch (born 1997), Austrian footballer

== See also ==
- 32821 Posch, a minor planet
- Kit violin, a German name for which is Posch
- Staatsanwalt Posch ermittelt, a German pseudo-documentary TV series which aired 2007–2008
