= PDU =

PDU may stand for:

- Project for Democratic Union, a European open-source think tank
- Partia për Drejtësi dhe Unitet (Party for Justice and Unity), a former political party in Albania
- Partidul Democrat al Unirii (Democratic Union Party), a political group in Romania
- Paysandú Airport (IATA: PDU)
- Power distribution unit, for electrical power
- Protocol data unit, in telecommunications
- Procedure defined unit, a unit of measurement relative to a specific application
- Professional Development Units, credits toward certification or re-certification at Project Management Institute (PMI)
- PDU, an independent record label co-founded by Italian singer Mina
