= PWBA =

PWBA may refer to:

- Professional Women's Bowling Association
- Pension and Welfare Benefits Administration
- Plane Wave Born Approximation
