= PZ =

PZ may refer to:

- PZ, Pérez Zeledón, San José, Costa Rica (city)
- PZ Cussons, a manufacturer
- PZ Myers (born 1957), an evolutionary developmental biologist, professor and blogger
- Preity Zinta (born 1975), an Indian actress and entrepreneur
  - Up Close & Personal with PZ, a talk show hosted by the actress
- Peshawar Zalmi, a cricket team franchise in Pakistan Super League
- Porphyrazine, in chemistry, a tetrapyyrolic macrocycle
- Province of Potenza, Italy
- Project Zomboid, an open-world zombie survival game
- Pozidriv, a type of screw head and screwdriver
- Pz: an EEG electrode site according to the 10-20 system
- Panzer, tanks in the German Army
- LATAM Paraguay, an airline based in Asunción, Paraguay (IATA code PZ)
- Pz' (born 2003), American rapper
