= PSO =

PSO may refer to:

== Orchestras ==
- Pacific Symphony Orchestra
- Peoria Symphony Orchestra
- Pittsburgh Symphony Orchestra
- Plano Symphony Orchestra
- Portland Symphony Orchestra
- Perth Symphony Orchestra

== Science and technology ==
- Particle swarm optimization, a swarm intelligence optimization technique
- Password Settings Object, used in Windows Active Directory environments
- Phase-shift oscillator, an electronic circuit that generates sine waves
- Projective special orthogonal group
- Protocol Support Organization, one of the three initial components of ICANN, later disbanded
- PSO J318.5-22, a rogue planet discovered in 2013
- Proximal subungual onychomycosis, a type of nail infection.

== Other uses ==
- Pakistan State Oil
- Patient safety organization
- Paysite operator, the operator of a paysite, typically pornographic
- Peace Support Operations, a military term used by NATO
- Penalty shootout, a method of determining a winner in sports matches which would have otherwise been drawn or tied
- Phantasy Star Online, a series of online role-playing video games
  - Phantasy Star Online, the first game in the series
- Phone sex operator, a person who provides phone sex service
- Producers Sales Organization, an independent motion picture production and distribution company
- Protective services officer, a member of police in Australia who performs policing duties at specific locations
- Psoriasis, an autoimmune disease
- PSO-1, a Soviet telescopic sight
- Public Safety Officer, another name for police, firefighters, ambulance crews and other providing safety services in the U.S.
- Public Service Company of Oklahoma
- Public service obligation, a form of state subsidy for transport links which are not commercially viable
- Puro Sangue Orientale, a breed of horse in Italy
- The FAA LID code for Stevens Field airport in Archuleta County, Colorado, United States
- The IATA code for Antonio Nariño Airport, serving the Colombian city of Pasto
- Personal Security Officers
- Provider Services Operations, a team at the National Marrow Donor Program
