= PLAF =

PLAF may refer to:

- Phil Lesh and Friends
- Pluggable look and feel in Java Applications
- People's Liberation Armed Forces of South Vietnam—Viet Cong's army
