= PSV =

PSV may refer to:

- Papa Stour Airstrip (IATA code PSV)
- Partial specific volume
- Peak systolic velocity
- Petit Saint Vincent, an island south of St. Vincent in the Grenadine islands
- Platform supply vessel, a specific type of ship
- PlayStation Vita, a handheld game console produced by Sony Computer Entertainment
- Police Support Volunteer, the rank of a volunteer performing civilian work for British Police Forces
- Pressure safety valve
- Pressure Support Ventilation, a form of pressure cycled ventilation that gives a patient a set pressure of air at every breath initialization
- PSV, an abbreviation for "Private Security Vehicle", a fictional ship in the 2017 Indian film PSV Garuda Vega
- PSV Eindhoven, a football club from Eindhoven, Netherlands
  - PSV Eindhoven (women), the women's football team representing PSV Eindhoven
- Jong PSV – Reserve team of PSV Eindhoven
- PSV Nickerie, a football club from Nieuw Nickerie, Suriname
