= PYG =

PYG may refer to:

- PYG, the IATA code for Pakyong Airport, a greenfield RCS airport in Pakyong, India
- Paraguayan guaraní, currency by ISO 4217 currency code
- PYG, the National Rail code for Paisley Gilmour Street railway station, Renfrewshire, Scotland
- PYG (band), a defunct Japanese rock music group
- PitchYaGame, a movement to showcase indie games at Twitter/X
- Glycogen phosphorylase
- Professor Pyg, a DC comics supervillain
