= PH (disambiguation) =

pH is a measure of acidity or alkalinity.

PH, ph, pH, and Ph may also refer to:

== Arts and media ==
- PistonHeads, a motoring website and forum
- PH (band), formerly known as Mr. Peter Hayden, a Finnish band
- Pornhub, a pornographic video sharing website
- Production house

== Aviation ==
- Prefix for the Netherlands; see List of aircraft registration prefixes
- IATA airline designator for Polynesian Airlines; see List of airline codes (P)
- Transavia Denmark (IATA: PH)

== Companies and organizations ==
- Parker-Hannifin Corporation (stock ticker PH)
- Pakatan Harapan (also known as "Alliance of Hope"), a political coalition in Malaysia
- Pizza Hut, a pizza restaurant chain

== Places ==
- Philippines (ISO 3166-2 country code PH), a country located in Southeast Asia
- Port Harcourt, (alternative name of the city)
- Preston Hollow, Dallas, a neighborhood
- PH postcode area, postcode area in Scotland

== Science and technology ==
=== Chemistry ===
- Phenyl group, either -Ph or Φ, highly-stable and aromatic hydrocarbon unit found in many organic compounds
- Pleckstrin homology domain, a part of many proteins which bind phosphoinositides with high affinity

=== Computing ===
- .ph, the Philippines' Internet country code top-level domain
- Ph protocol, an early web database search for CCSO Nameserver described by RFC 2378
- PH (complexity), the union of all complexity classes in the polynomial hierarchy in computational complexity theory

=== Physics ===
- Phot, or ph, a measurement of illuminance, in photometry
- Picohenry, an SI Unit of electrical inductance

=== Other sciences ===
- Planet Hunters, a group that hunts for exoplanets
- Precipitation hardening, a heat treatment technique used to increase the yield strength of malleable materials
- Pulmonary hypertension, a medical condition

== Other uses ==
- pʰ, a phoneme
- Ph (digraph), a common digraph that represents the phoneme /f/ (voiceless labiodental fricative) in phonetics
- PH, abbreviation for professional hunter used in East and Southern Africa
- (ph), a notation used in transcripts to indicate that the transcriber does not know the spelling, usually of a name, and has spelled it as it was pronounced (phonetically)
- pH Care, a feminine hygiene brand in the Philippines owned by UL Skin Sciences, Inc., a subsidiary of Unilab
- PH (footballer) (born 1991), Brazilian footballer Philippe Guimarães
- Poul Henningsen (1894–1967), Danish writer and designer known in Denmark as PH
- Professional hunter
- Public house, most commonly referred to as pub, an establishment licensed to serve alcoholic drinks
- Purple Heart, a US military award, in post-nominal designation
- Pinch hitter, in baseball
- abbreviation used to denote the English regnal years of Philip II of Spain
- P^{ḥ}, abbreviation (e.g. on maps) for parish, also in the meaning of civil parish
- Phillips, a type of cross-head screw drive bits
- ⲣⲏ, Coptic for the Egyptian deity Ra
- Patrouilleurs Hauturiers program of the French Navy

== See also ==
- Phi (φ), a letter of the Greek alphabet
