= PFP =

PFP or PfP may stand for:

== Government and politics ==
- Partido Federal ng Pilipinas (transl. Federal Party of the Philippines), a big tent political party in the Philippines
- People First Party (South Korea)
- People First Party (Republic of China), a political party in the Republic of China (Taiwan)
- Peace and Freedom Party (USA)
- Progressive Federal Party (South Africa)
- Popular Front Party (Ghana)
- Federal Preventive Police (Mexico) (Policía Federal Preventiva)
- Partnership for Peace, a NATO programme for Warsaw Pact countries post-dissolution of the Soviet empire

== Science and technology ==
- Diphosphate—fructose-6-phosphate 1-phosphotransferase enzyme
- Passive fire protection
- Pentafluorophenyl esters
- Perfluoropentacene (organic semiconductor)
- Perforin (formerly PFP gene)
- Photoelectric flame photometer
- Plutonium Finishing Plant, at Hanford Site nuclear research complex, Washington, USA
- Pore-forming proteins

== Sports ==
- Pitchers' fielding practice (baseball)
- Pauline Ferrand-Prévot (born 1992), French racing cyclist

== Other ==
- Profile picture or avatar
- Pay for performance (healthcare)
- Porno for Pyros
- Places for People, the largest housing association in England
- Personal Financial Planner
- Prep for Prep
- Pay-for-play
