= PDQ =

PDQ may refer to:

== Computing ==
- Powerbook G3 PDQ, an Apple laptop computer
- Qualcomm pdQ, an early smartphone and precursor to the Kyocera 6035
- PDQ (Pretty DUN Quick), performance analysis software by Neil J. Gunther
- Physician Data Query, the US National Cancer Institute cancer database

== Entertainment ==
- PDQ (game show), a 1960s US television show
- Prose Descriptive Qualities, a role-playing game system

== Other uses ==
- PDQ Food Stores, a former chain of convenience stores in Wisconsin
- PDQ Chocolate, a drink mix
- PDQ terminal (Process Data Quickly), for payment card transactions
- Production, drilling and quarters, of an oil platform e.g. Thunder Horse PDQ
- PDQ Air Charter (ICAO airline code), United States
- PDQ Chicken, a Florida based fast food chain

== See also ==
- P. D. Q. Bach, a fictitious composer
