= PNH =

PNH can stand for:

- Police Nationale d’Haïti
- Police Nationale d’Haïti Football Club
- National Party of Honduras
- Paroxysmal nocturnal hemoglobinuria
- Parelli Natural Horsemanship
- IATA Airport Code for Phnom Penh International Airport
