= PACOM =

PACOM may refer to:

- United States Pacific Command
- Pan-African Congress of Mathematicians
