= PNG (disambiguation) =

PNG or Portable Network Graphics (.png) is an image file format.

PNG also commonly refers to:

- Papua New Guinea, a country in Oceania, in the southwestern Pacific Ocean
- Persona non grata, a Latin term meaning "an unwelcome person", used for a diplomat being pressured to leave another country

PNG or Png may also refer to:

== Organisations ==
- Partidul Noua Generație, former name of a Romanian political party
- Port Neches–Groves High School, in Port Neches, Texas
- Philippine National Games, the national multi-sport tournament of the Philippines
- P. N. G. Jewellers, Indian jewellery company

== Science and technology ==
- Piped natural gas, a gaseous fossil fuel delivered by pipeline
- Planetary nebula presented in galactic coordinates

== Other uses ==
- Png (surname), a Min Nan Chinese surname
- Pongu language (ISO 639-3 code png), a Kainji language of Nigeria
