= PDG =

PDG may refer to:

- Gabonese Democratic Party (Parti démocratique gabonais), a political party in Gabon
- Democratic Party of Guinea or Parti démocratique de Guinée
- Minangkabau International Airport, Padang, Indonesia IATA airport code
- Particle Data Group, international group of particle physicists
- Program dependence graph, in computer science, a diagram to clarify dependencies
- Patrouille des Glaciers, skiing competition organised by the Swiss military
- Permanent downhole gauge, pressure or temperature gauge in an oil or gas well
- Padgate railway station, England (station code)
- PDG S.A., Brazilian real estate company
- Président-directeur général, a combination of chairman and CEO in France
- Phänomenologie des Geistes (Phenomenology of Spirit) by Hegel
- Public Data Group, for accessibility of official UK data
