= Paw (disambiguation) =

A paw is the soft foot of a mammal, generally a quadruped, that has claws or nails.

Paw may also refer to:

== Film ==
- Paw (film), a 1959 film
- Paws (film), a 1997 Australian independent film starring Billy Connolly

== Music ==
- Paw (band), an American musical group
- PAWS (band), a Scottish alternative rock band
- Paws (EP), a 2001 EP by Four Tet
- Paw Tracks, an independent record label based in Washington, D.C.
- Paws., a 2007 album by Pull Tiger Tail

== Sports ==
- Paws (Detroit Tigers), the mascot for the Detroit Tigers of Major League Baseball
- Paws (Northeastern), the mascot for the Northeastern University Huskies
- PAWS London Capital, a basketball team

== Businesses and organizations ==
=== Animal-related ===
- P.A.W.S., or Pets Are Wonderful Support, a group of North American nonprofit organisations
- PAWS Chicago (Pets Are Worth Saving), a non-profit animal shelter organization
- Pakistan Animal Welfare Society, a non-governmental institution in Pakistan advocating on animal rights and welfare
- Performing Animal Welfare Society, an advocacy group and sanctuary in Galt, California
- Philippine Animal Welfare Society, a non-governmental institution in the Philippines advocating on animal rights and welfare

=== Other businesses and organizations ===
- Paws, Inc., the U.S. company that produces the comic strip Garfield
- Neopup PAW-20 (Personal Assault Weapon, 20 mm), a grenade launcher
- Pentecostal Assemblies of the World (P.A.W.), a Oneness Pentecostal organization
- Pintubi Anmatjere Warlpiri Media or PAW Media, a media company in Yurendumu, Northern Territory, Australia
- Project African Wilderness

== Other ==
- PAVE PAWS or Phased Array Warning System, a United States' Air Force Space Command radar system
- Paw Lagermann, composer, member of the popduo Infernal
- Physics Analysis Workstation
- Planted Ancient Woodland Site
- Plasma arc welding
- Post-acute-withdrawal syndrome, a medical condition affecting recovering addicts
- Post Apocalyptic World
- Princeton Alumni Weekly
- Prodigious accumulator of wealth, a term used in the book The Millionaire Next Door
- Professional Adventure Writer, an adventure creation system for the ZX Spectrum computer
- Projector augmented wave method, a method of solid state physics to calculate the electronic structure of materials
- Protect Against Wrapped Sequence numbers, a feature of Transmission Control Protocol
- Wasilla Airport (ICAO location indicator: PAWS), in Wasilla, Alaska, United States
- Paw Peters, (born 1976) Danish handball player

== See also ==
- Paw Paw (disambiguation)
- Pawa (disambiguation)
