= PWA =

PWA may refer to:

== Aviation ==
- Wiley Post Airport (IATA airport code), Oklahoma City, Oklahoma, U.S.
- Pacific Western Airlines

== Computing ==
- Pirates with Attitudes, a warez release group
- Picasa Web Albums
- Progressive web app
- Project Web Access, later renamed Project Web App, a component of Microsoft Project Server

== Organizations ==
- Provincial Waterworks Authority, a Thai state water supply company
- Public Works Administration, the construction agency of the US New Deal program
- Patients' Welfare Association in Karachi, Pakistan
- Progressive Writers' Association, in pre-partition India
- The Polytechnic of Western Australia

== Sports ==
- Professional Windsurfers Association; see Windsurfing
- Prairie Wrestling Alliance, a Canadian professional wrestling promotion based in Edmonton
- Reality of Wrestling or Pro Wrestling Alliance, a US independent professional wrestling promotion
- Pro Wrestling America, a defunct independent professional wrestling promotion

== Other uses ==
- People With AIDS, an initialism
- People with albinism, an initialism
- Portuguese West Africa, now Angola
- Partial wave analysis, a technique in quantum mechanics

== See also ==
- Pro Wrestling Women's Alliance
