= PRM =

== Business ==
- Partner relationship management, in IT
- Person with reduced mobility, in transport
- Professional Risk Manager, a certification

== Computer science ==
- Probabilistic relational model
- Probabilistic roadmap in robotics

== Government and politics ==
- Bureau of Population, Refugees, and Migration, of US State Department
- Partido de la Revolución Mexicana (Party of the Mexican Revolution), later Institutional Revolutionary Party (Partido Revolucionario Institucional, PRI)
- Partido Revolucionario Moderno (Modern Revolutionary Party), Dominican Republic
- Partidul România Mare or Greater Romania Party, ultra-nationalist party
- Parti de Regroupement Mauritanien or Mauritanian Regroupment Party, a former party
- Parti Rakyat Malaysia, party in Malaysia
- Partido Republicano Mineiro or Republican Party of Minas Gerais, Brazilian party 1888-1937
- Partido Revolucionário de Moçambique or Revolutionary Party of Mozambique, Mozambican rebel group 1974/76–1982
- People's Revolutionary Militia, former Grenada militia
- An alternative name for Al-Shabaab (militant group)
- Presidential Review Memorandum, US national security directives during Carter presidency

== Technology ==
- Parallel reaction monitoring in mass spectrometry
- Precision runway monitor, Raytheon radar system
