= PA6 =

PA6 may refer to:

- Pennsylvania Route 6
- Pennsylvania's 6th congressional district
- Piper PA-6, a four-seat light aircraft of the 1940s
- Pitcairn PA-6 Super Mailwing, a biplane of the 1920s
- Polyamide 6, or Nylon 6, a synthetic fibre
