= PTL =

PTL may refer to:

- Panther Lake, a line of Intel mobile processors
- Pass transistor logic
- Pittsburgh Today Live, a program on KDKA-TV
- Point Lookout, New York
- Propositional temporal logic
- "PTL", a song by Relient K from the album Collapsible Lung
- PTL Satellite Network
- The PTL Club, a Christian television program (1974–1989)
