= PRK =

PRK can refer to:

- North Korea, ISO 3166-1 alpha-3 code
- Photorefractive keratectomy, laser eye surgery
- Phase reversal keying, a form of phase-shift keying
- People's Republic of Korea, short-lived 1945 government
- People's Republic of Kampuchea, 1979-1989
- Port Kent (Amtrak station), New York, US station code
- Phosphoribulokinase, an enzyme
- Puneeth Rajkumar, an Indian Kannada-language film actor
