= Put Your Money Where Your Mouth Is =

Put Your Money Where Your Mouth Is may refer to:

- "Put Your Money Where Your Mouth Is" (song), a 2006 song by Jet
- Put Your Money Where Your Mouth Is (EP), a 1994 EP by Die Toten Hosen
- Put Your Money Where Your Mouth Is (TV programme), a British antique-themed game show
- "Put Your Money Where Your Mouth Is (Buy Me!)", the English-language version of the song "Kauf MICH!"
- "Put Your Money Where Your Mouth Is", an episode of King of Vegas
- "Put Yer Money Where Yer Mouth Is", a song by Oasis from Standing on the Shoulder of Giants
