= PLN =

PLN or pln or variation, may refer to:

== Places ==
- Pellston Regional Airport, Pellston, Michigan, USA; IATA airport code PLN
- Picton, Lennox and Nueva, islands near the southern tip of South America

== Organisations ==
- Liberal Nationalist Party (Spanish: Partido Liberal Nacionalista), a former political party of Nicaragua
- National Liberal Party (Panama) (Spanish: Partido Liberal Nacional), a political party of Panama
- National Liberation Party (Costa Rica) (Spanish: Partido Liberación Nacional), a political party of Costa Rica
- Perusahaan Listrik Negara, Indonesian government-owned electricity company

== Science and technology ==
- Phospholamban, a protein
- Peripheral lymph node
- Pln, the abbreviation for the orchid genus Pleione
- .pln, a file extension used by SilkTest
- Probabilistic logic network
- Planetary nebula

== Other uses ==
- Polish złoty, currency by ISO 4217 currency code
- Palenquero, ISO 639 language code pln
- Personal learning network
- Port letter and number, identifying fishing vessels

== See also ==
- P. L. N. Padfield (1932–2012), British author
- Plan (disambiguation)
