= PGK =

PGK may refer to:

- Papua New Guinean kina, the currency of Papua New Guinea by ISO 4217 code
- Pasukan Gerakan Khas, a Malaysian police special operations unit
- Phosphoglycerate kinase, an enzyme
- XM1156 Precision Guidance Kit, a U.S. Army program for artillery shells
- Depati Amir Airport, Indonesia
