= PKI =

PKI may refer to:

- Partai Komunis Indonesia, the Communist Party of Indonesia
- Peter Kiewit Institute, an Information Technology and Engineering school of the University of Nebraska system
- Protein kinase inhibitor, a type of enzyme inhibitor that specifically blocks the action of one or more protein kinases
- Public key infrastructure, a computer security technology
- Paramount’s Kings Island, a theme park in Ohio (now simply Kings Island)
