= Pun (disambiguation) =

A pun is a figure of speech that plays on words that are similar to each other.

Pun, PUN or PuN may also refer to:

== Computing ==
- PunBB, an internet discussion board system, originally known as Pun
- Type punning, a computer programming technique
- Pull-up network, an arrangement of PMOS logic

== Political parties ==
- Tenkuntre Parti de l'unité nationale, Haiti
- Partido da Unidade Nacional, Guinea-Bissau
- Partido de Unidade Nacional, Mozambique
- Partido Unión Nacional, Costa Rica

== Other uses ==
- Pun (surname), a Chinese, English, and Magar surname
- Pun, a tool used to tamp down clay in puddling
- Plutonium(III)-nitride (PuN), a radioactive substance

== See also ==
- Big Pun, a rapper
- Sita Tiwaree, Thai politician with the nickname, Pun
