= PMSL =

PMSL may refer to:

- P_{MSL}, pressure at mean sea level, a measurement of atmospheric pressure
- Pissing myself laughing, Internet slang similar to LOL
