= PWR =

PWR may refer to:

== Sports ==
- Paul Weel Racing, an Australian V8 Supercar motor racing team
- Philippine Wrestling Revolution, Filipino indie pro-wrestling promotion
- Pickleball World Rankings, an international pickleball tour
- Premiership Women's Rugby, top level of women's rugby union in England
- Pro Wrestling Report, TV/radio program from Milwaukee, United States
- PWR (esports), an e-sports organization
- PWR Racing, a Swedish auto racing team

== Other ==
- Parliament of the World's Religions, interfaith conferences
- Politechnika Wroclawska, Wroclaw University of Technology
- Pratt & Whitney Rocketdyne, an American company producing rocket engines
- Pressurized water reactor, a type of nuclear power reactor
- Power to weight ratio, a calculation applied to engines
- Preston and Wyre Joint Railway, a historic railway company in Lancashire, England
- PWR Advance Cooling Technology, motor racing component manufacturer in Queensland, Australia
- Quanta Services, NYSE stock ticker symbol
