= PST =

PST or pst may refer to:

== Time zones ==
- Pacific Standard Time, UTC−08:00 (western North America)
- Pakistan Standard Time (usually PKT), UTC+05:00
- Philippine Standard Time (also PHST or PHT), UTC+08:00

== Science and technology ==
- Lead scandium tantalate, a ceramic material
- Partial stroke testing, of valves
- Penoscrotal transposition, in medicine
- Personal Storage Table, a file format used in Microsoft applications
- Planar separator theorem, in graph theory
- Pocket set theory, in mathematics
- Post-stall technology, an aircraft control system
- Program structure tree, in computer programming
- P_{st}^{LM}, short-term light flicker metric
- Puccinia striiformis f.sp. tritici, or wheat yellow rust

== Economics and taxes ==
- Prebisch–Singer thesis, or Prebisch–Singer hypothesis
- Provincial Sales Tax, a sales tax in some Canadian provinces

== Places ==
- Trail of Remembrance and Comradeship (Slovene: Pot spominov in tovarištva), a walkway in Ljubljana, Slovenia
- Poznań Fast Tram (Polish: Poznański Szybki Tramwaj), Poland
- Prestonpans railway station, East Lothian, Scotland, a station code

== Other uses ==
- Norwegian Police Security Service (Norwegian: Politiets sikkerhetstjeneste)
- Planescape: Torment, a 1999 video game
- Proto-Sino-Tibetan language
- Social Labour Party (Portuguese: Partido Social Trabalhista), a defunct political party in Brazil
- PST, in linguistics, an abbreviation for past tense
