= PICS =

PICS may refer to:

- Passive Inspection CubeSat, two nanosatellites launched in 2021
- Platform for Internet Content Selection, a content rating specification for websites
- Pacific Islands Central School/Pohnpei Island Central School, now Bailey Olter High School
- Post-intensive care syndrome
- Private investment capital subscription
- Protocol implementation conformance statement
- Punjab Institute of Computer Science
- Purdue Improved Crop Storage bags
- Phase Imaging with Computational Specificity

Pics or pics, may refer to:

- Slang abbreviation of pictures
- .pics, a generic top-level domain name administered by Cayman Islands-based company Uniregistry

== See also ==
- PIC (disambiguation)
