= PBB =

PBB may refer to:

- Deutsche Pfandbriefbank, a German bank abbreviated to and traded as PBB
- Parallel Building Blocks, an Intel multicore programming product
- Partai Bulan Bintang (Crescent Star Party), an Indonesian political party
- Parti Pesaka Bumiputera Bersatu (United Bumiputera Heritage Party), a Malaysian political party
- Passenger boarding bridge or jet bridge, a connector that extends from an airport terminal gate to an airplane
- Pauls und Braunes Beiträge or Beiträge zur Geschichte der deutschen Sprache und Literatur (Contributions to the History of the German Language and Literature), an academic journal
- Philippine Business Bank, a Filipino savings bank
- Pinoy Big Brother, the Philippine edition of the reality television franchise Big Brother
- Polybrominated biphenyl, a group of manufactured chemicals
- Provider Backbone Bridges or IEEE 802.1ah-2008, a set of network routing protocols
- Public Bank Berhad, a Malaysian bank
- Perserikatan Bangsa-Bangsa, the Indonesian name for the United Nations
- Penny's Big Breakaway, a 2024 platformer video game

== See also ==
- PBBM, the initialism for President Bongbong Marcos, the 17th and current President of the Philippines
