= PRC (disambiguation) =

PRC often refers to the People's Republic of China.

PRC, prc, or P.R.C. may also refer to:

== Organizations ==
=== Political ===
- Communist Refoundation Party, (Partito della Rifondazione Comunista), Italy
- Regionalist Party of Cantabria
- Popular Resistance Committees, Palestinian militant organizations
- People's Redemption Council, Liberian early 1980s military regime
- Pasadena Republican Club
- People's Republic of the Congo, former country in Africa (until 1992)
- Republic of the Congo, successor of the People's Republic of the Congo, ongoing UNDP code

=== Other organizations ===
- Pew Research Center
- Philippine Red Cross
- Philippine Racing Club, a horse racing institution
- Postal Regulatory Commission, an independent regulatory agency in the US
- Presbyterian Reformed Church (Australia)
- Producers Releasing Corporation, Hollywood film studio 1939–1947
- Professional Regulation Commission, Philippines
- Protestant Reformed Churches in America
- Philippine Refining Company, the former name of Unilever Philippines (1927–1993)

== Science and technology ==
=== Biology ===
- Phase response curve, graph of biological responses to light or other time cues
- Photosynthetic reaction centre, the molecular unit responsible for absorbing light in photosynthesis
- Progesterone receptor C, one of the isoforms of the progesterone receptor

=== Computing and telecommunication ===
- PRC (Palm OS)pac0710-androidOS/1, computer code database file format, also used in e-books as Mobipocket MOBI and Kindle AZW
- PRC (file format), a way to store 3D data in a PDF file
- Primary reference clock, for synchronization in telecommunications

=== LCD ===
- Panel Response Correction (PRC)

=== Other uses in science and technology ===
- Passive radiative cooling, a solar radiation management strategy to reverse global warming.
- Practical reserve capacity, for traffic at a traffic signal junction
- Prestressed reinforced concrete, a prestressed concrete
- Precast reinforced concrete

== Other uses ==
- Ernest A. Love Field (IATA airport code), an airport near Prescott, Arizona, US
- Premier's Reading Challenge, a reading challenge for school students in parts of Australia
- Pregnancy Resource Center, a nonprofit organization offering pregnant women resources and counseling for alternatives to abortion
- Premier Coach, parent of Vermont Translines, American bus company
- "PRC" (song), by Peso Pluma and Natanael Cano, 2023

== See also ==
- Peach PRC, an Australian singer, songwriter, and internet personality
- Polycomb repressive complex 2 or PRC2, a protein
- AN/PRC, for "Army/Navy, Portable, Radio, Communication", e.g. AN/PRC-77 Portable Transceiver
