= PRD =

PRD may refer to:

== Political parties ==
=== Active ===
- Democratic Renewal Party (Angola) (Partido Renovador Democrático)
- Democratic Renewal Party (Benin) (Parti de Renouveau Démocratique)
- Democratic Renewal Party (Brazil) (Partido Renovação Democrática)
- Dominican Revolutionary Party (Partido Revolucionario Dominicano), Dominican Republic
- People's Democratic Party (Indonesia) (Partai Rakyat Demokratik)
- Party of the Democratic Revolution (Partido de la Revolución Democrática), Mexico
- Democratic Revolutionary Party (Partido Revolucionario Democrático), Panama

=== Defunct ===
- Democratic Renewal Party (Portugal) (Partido Renovador Democrático)
- Democratic Reformist Party (Partido Reformista Democrático), Spain
- Free Democratic Party of Switzerland (Parti radical-démocratique)

== Science and technology ==
- Partial rootzone drying, an irrigation technique
- Product requirements document
- Pale Red Dot, alternative name for Proxima Centauri, the nearest star to the Solar System

== Other uses ==
- Pearl River Delta, in south China
- Presidential Review Directive, a kind of national security directive from the Bill Clinton presidency
