= PBN =

PBN may refer to:

- PBN (producer), aka Panjabi By Nature, UK-based South Asian music producer
- PBN Broadcasting Network, a media network in Bicol Region, Philippines
- Providence Business News, a weekly business journal in Rhode Island
- Pegboard Nerds, an electronic music group

== Abbreviations ==
- Paris by Night, a Vietnamese music variety show
- Parabrachial nuclei
- Principal bicycle network, a proposed network of bicycle infrastructure in Sydney and surrounding cities in New South Wales, Australia
- PBN-1 Nomad, a derivative of the Consolidated PBY Catalina aircraft
- PbNation, an internet forum
- Paint by numbers, a common name for nonogram puzzles
- Parliamentary Broadcasting Network in Australia, became ABC NewsRadio
- Performance-based navigation
- Private blog network, an search engine optimization technique
- N-tert-butyl-α-phenylnitrone [3376-24-7], a spin trap compound
