= PKE =

PKE may refer to:

- Park Electrochemical Corporation, a global advanced materials company
- Palm kernel, the edible seed of the oil palm tree
- a code of the Parkes Airport
- Południowy Koncern Energetyczny, a Polish power company
- Post-Keynesian economics, a school of economic thought
- Public Key Encryption, from asymmetrical cryptography
- Presidents and Key Executives MBA, a degree granted by Pepperdine University
