= PLM =

PLM may refer to:

- Pamantasan ng Lungsod ng Maynila, state university of Manila, Philippines
- Plant lifecycle management, of industrial plant
- Premier Loyalty & Marketing, a Mexican company operating Club Premier
- Product lifecycle management
- Product life cycle management (marketing)
- Payload Module - any system or subsystem that is a part of a payload. See sample usage of the term in Solar and Heliospheric Observatory#Instruments
- Pusat Latihan Mekanik (Mechanical Training Centre), later IBTE Mechanical Campus, Brunei
- People's Liberation Music, a 1970s British political music group
- Paide Linnameeskond, Estonian football club

== Politics ==
- Partido Lakas ng Masa, a Philippine political party
- Partido Liberal Mexicano, a pre-1910 Revolution Mexican political party
- Partido Laborista Mexicano, the predecessor of the Institutional Revolutionary Party of Mexico

== Technology and science ==
- PL/M, a computer programming language
- Pulse-length modulation, an alternative name for pulse-width modulation
- PLM, Pretrained Language Model, in Natural Language Processing, further developed into LLM, Large Language Model

== Transport ==
- Sultan Mahmud Badaruddin II Airport, Palembang, Indonesia, IATA code
- Palmerah railway station, Jakarta, Indonesia, station code
- Perahu layar motor, a type of lambo (boat), Indonesia
- Chemins de fer de Paris à Lyon et à la Méditerranée, a French railway company
