= PBR =

PBR may refer to:

== Organizations ==
- Paris Basket Racing, a former professional basketball club based in Paris, France
- Parti Burkinabè pour la Refondation, Burkina Faso political party
- Pelita Bandung Raya, a football club based in Bandung, Indonesia
- Petrobras (NYSE stock ticker code PBR), Brazilian oil company
- Polski Bank Rozwoju, a former Polish bank
- Professional Bull Riders, an international professional bull riding organization

== Science and technology ==
- Pusey-Barrett-Rudolph theorem about the reality of quantum states

=== Computing, electronics, electrics ===
- Partition boot record, of a computer hard drive
- Passive bistatic radar
- Pebble-bed reactor, a type of nuclear fission reactor
- Physically based rendering, a method used in computer graphics
- Policy-based routing, in computer networking

=== Chemistry, biochemistry ===
- Packed Bed Reactor, in chemical processing
- Peripheral benzodiazepine receptor, another name for translocator protein
- Phosphorus bromide (PBr)
- Photobioreactor

=== Geology ===
- Periodic Bedrock Ridges
- Precariously balanced rock, another name for a balancing rock

== Business, finance, and government ==
- Payment by Results
- Performance-based regulation of utilities
- Plant breeders' rights over new varieties
- Pre-Budget Report, one of the two economic forecasts that HM Treasury is required to deliver to the UK Parliament each year
- Presidential budget request, part of the United States budget process
- Price-to-book ratio, ratio of a company's stock price to its book value

== Military ==
- Patrol Boat, River, a US Navy designation
- Patrol boat riverine
- Plastic baton round, a type of non-lethal projectile

== Transportation ==
- Potters Bar railway station (National Rail station code PBR), Hertfordshire, England, UK
- Puffing Billy Railway, tourist railway in Melbourne, Australia

== Other ==
- Pabst Blue Ribbon, an American beer brand

== See also ==
- PBRS
- Pontypool and Blaenavon Railway (P&BR), South Wales, UK
