= PLK =

PLK may refer to:

- PLK (rapper) (born 1997), French rapper of Polish and Corsican origin
- PKP PLK, a Polish railroad company
- PLK Vicwood KT Chong Sixth Form College
- Polska Liga Koszykówki, Polish Basketball League
- Polskie Linie Kolejowe, Polish railway infrastructure manager
- Pulkovo Airlines, ICAO airline designator
- M. Graham Clark Downtown Airport, Missouri, USA, IATA code
- Perfect Liberty Kyodan, a new religious movement
- Po Leung Kuk, a Hong Kong charitable organisation
- Polo-like kinase, regulators of the cell cycle (mitosis)

== See also ==
- Polo-like kinase 1, an enzyme encoded by the PLK1 gene
