= PG-13 (disambiguation) =

PG-13 is a common type of content rating that applies to media entertainment, such as films and television shows, generally denoting, "Parental Guidance: Some material may be inappropriate for children under 13." Countries and organizations that use the rating include:

- The Motion Picture Association film rating system in the US
- The Infocomm Media Development Authority in Singapore
- The film classification system used in Jamaica
- The film classification system used by the Ministry of Information of the United Arab Emirates
- The television classification system used in Thailand

The "PG-13" rating is further documented at Motion picture content rating system and Television content rating system.

PG-13 may also refer to:

- PG-13 (album), by Sharon Needles
- PG-13 (professional wrestling), the wrestling team
- Paul George, professional basketball player, nicknamed PG-13
