= Pei =

PEI or Pei may refer to:

== Places ==
- Matecaña International Airport, Pereira, Colombia, IATA code PEI
- Pei County (沛县), Jiangsu, China
- Pei Commandery (沛郡), a commandery in Chinese history
- Prince Edward Island, a province of Canada
- Pei, Tibet, a town in Tibet

== People ==
- Bei (surname) (貝), romanized Pei in Wade–Giles
- Pei (surname), a Chinese surname (裴) or an Italian surname
- I. M. Pei (1917–2019), a Chinese-American architect
- Mario Pei (1901–1978), an Italian-American linguist

== Polymers ==
- Polyetherimide (PEI), a thermoplastic similar to PEEK
- Polyethylenimine (PEI), a type of water-soluble polymer

== Other uses ==
- Paul Ehrlich Institute, Germany
- Pei language
- Pe (Semitic letter) (פ), or pei, a letter in the Hebrew alphabet
- Princeton Environmental Institute of Princeton University
- Private Education Institution (Singapore)
- Shar Pei, a wrinkled dog breed
- Pie
- Pee (disambiguation)
