= PKMS =

PKMS may refer to:

- Pertubuhan Kebangsaan Melayu Singapura (Singapore Malay National Organisation), a political party in Singapore
- Pui Kiu Middle School, Quarry Bay, Hong Kong
- Personal knowledge management system, a system for PKM
