= PLC =

PLC or plc may refer to:

- Public limited company, a type of public company

== Education ==
- Platoon Leaders Class, of the US Marine Corps Officer Candidates School
- Post Leaving Certificate, a qualification in Ireland
- Presbyterian Ladies' College (disambiguation), several schools in Australia
- Professional learning community, for collaborative learning

== Medicine ==
- Perlecan, a protein in humans
- Peptide loading complex, an intracellular membrane protein matrix
- Peter Lougheed Centre, a hospital in Calgary, Alberta, Canada
- Phospholipase C, a class of membrane-associated enzymes
- Pityriasis lichenoides chronica, a skin condition
- Posterolateral corner, a region of the human knee

== Politics ==
- Colombian Liberal Party (Spanish: Partido Liberal Colombiano)
- Conservative Party (Spain) (Spanish: Partido Liberal-Conservador)
- Constitutionalist Liberal Party (Spanish: Partido Liberal Constitucionalista), in Nicaragua
- Liberal Party of Canada (French: Parti Libéral du Canada)
- Palestinian Legislative Council, of the Palestinian Authority
- Pennsylvania Leadership Conference, in the US
- Presidential Leadership Council, in Yemen
- Provisional Legislative Council, in Hong Kong 1997–1998

== Technology ==
- Packet loss concealment, in VoIP communications
- Planar lightwave circuit splitter, a type of fiber-optic splitter
- Portevin–Le Chatelier effect, jerky flow under plastic deformation
- Power-line communication, or power-line carrier
- Product lifecycle, from inception to manufacture
- Programmable logic controller, an industrial digital computer

== Other uses ==
- Phi Life Cypher, a British hip hop group
- Pine Lake Camp, one of the Salvation Army camps in Canada
- Polish–Lithuanian Commonwealth
- Portland Lesbian Choir, in Oregon, US
- Prism Leisure Corporation, a former British company
- UAE Pro League Committee, a football organising committee

== See also ==
- PL/C, a programming language
