= PNS =

PNS may refer to:

== Medicine ==
- Peripheral nervous system
- Parasympathetic nervous system, rarely used, usually abbreviated as "PSNS" to avoid confusion with peripheral nervous system
- Peripheral nerve stimulation of the occipital nerves
- Paraneoplastic syndrome
- Pilonidal sinus
- Posterior nasal spine, a cephalometric landmark

== Military ==
- Portsmouth Naval Shipyard, United States
- Pakistan Navy Ship

== Science & technology ==
- Post-normal science, approach to making policy with uncertain information
- Process network synthesis, a process engineering tool

== Transport ==
- Pensacola International Airport, IATA airport code
- Pensacola station (Amtrak), Amtrak station code

== Other ==
- Pakistan Nuclear Society
- Pickleball Nova Scotia, a Canadian provincial sport authority
- Program on Nonviolent Sanctions, at the Center for International Affairs at Harvard University, Cambridge, Massachusetts
- Public News Service, an American news media company
- Projected National Share, British political term
- Perfect North Slopes, a ski resort in Lawrenceburg, Indiana
