= PGCE =

PGCE can stand for:

- Postgraduate Certificate in Education, an English, Welsh and Northern Irish teacher-training qualification that includes master's credits
- Professional Graduate Certificate in Education, an English and Welsh teacher-training qualification that does not include master's credits
- Professional Graduate Diploma in Education, a Scottish teacher-training qualification formerly known as a PGCE
- Postgraduate Certificate in Endodontics, a one-year course in India by the Indira Gandhi National Open University (IGNOU) and the Dental Council of India (DCI)
