= PLF =

PLF may stand for:

== Science and technology ==
- Payload fairing
- Plant Load Factor

== Organisations ==
- Philippine Armed Forces
- Pacific Legal Foundation
- Palestinian Liberation Front
- Patrick Leigh Fermor
- Phil Lesh and Friends
- Popular Liberation Forces
- Pretty Lights Family
- The Princess Louise Fusiliers

== Transport ==
- Pala Airport, Chad (by IATA code)
- Passenger load factor
- Passenger locator form

== Other ==
- Premium large format theater, a type of auditorium with higher-end amenities
- Central Malayo-Polynesian languages (by ISO 639 code)
- Parachute landing fall
- Precision livestock farming
