= Person of Interest =

Person(s) of Interest or A Person of Interest may also refer to:

- Person of interest, an individual involved in a criminal investigation but not arrested or formally accused.

== Film and television ==
- Person of Interest (film), a 2024 British television film
- Person of Interest (TV series), a 2011–2016 American science fiction crime drama series
- Persons of Interest, a 2014 documentary series featuring Gary Foley
- "A Person of Interest" (Law & Order: Criminal Intent), a 2003 TV episode
- "A Person of Interest" (Medium), a 2009 TV episode
- "A Person of Interest" (Pretty Little Liars), a 2011 TV episode
- "Persons of Interest" (Lincoln Heights), a 2009 TV episode
- Person of Interest (The Morning Show), an episode of the American television series The Morning Show

== Other uses ==
- A Person of Interest (novel), by Susan Choi, 2008
- A Person of Interest (album), by DJ Paul, 2012
- "Person of Interest" (song), by Rebecca Black, 2011
