= PBC =

PBC may refer to:

== Organisations ==
=== General terms ===
- Public Benefit Corporation, a type of benefit corporation
- Prescribed Body Corporate, or Registered Native Title Body Corporate, a type of legal entity in Australia

=== Broadcasting ===
- Pakistan Broadcasting Corporation
- Palawan Broadcasting Corporation, Philippines
- Palestinian Broadcasting Corporation
- Persian Broadcasting Company
- Progressive Broadcasting Corporation, Philippines

=== Sports ===
- Pickleball BC, Canadian provincial pickleball oversight body
- Peach Belt Conference, US sports conference
- Premier Boxing Champions, televised boxing event

=== Other ===
- Pakistan Bar Council
- Parole Board of Canada
- Party of Bible-abiding Christians (Partei Bibeltreuer Christen), Germany
- Peacebuilding Commission, United Nations body
- People's Bank of China
- Pittsburgh Brewing Company
- Punchbowl Bus Company

== Places ==
- Hermanos Serdán International Airport, Puebla, Mexico by IATA airport code
- Palm Beach County, Florida.

=== Schools ===
- Palm Beach Currumbin State High School, Queensland, Australia
- Portland Bible College, Oregon, United States
- Presentation Brothers College, Cork

== Science and technology ==
- Periodic boundary conditions, a set of boundary conditions used in computer simulations and mathematical models
- Primary biliary cholangitis or primary biliary cirrhosis, an autoimmune disease of the liver
- .pbc, filetype of Parrot bytecode in Parrot virtual machine
- Playback Control, a feature on Video CD

== Other uses ==
- PBC (web series), American comedy series
- Peru-Bolivian Confederation a short-lived post-spanish federal state
- Performance-based contracting
- Playboi Carti, American rapper
- Practice-based commissioning
- Process-based costing
