= PPM =

PPM may refer to:

== Business in general ==
- Planned preventive maintenance
- Project portfolio management
- Public performance measure, UK measure of rail punctuality

== Organizations ==
- Malaysian Scouts Association (Malay: Persekutuan Pengakap Malaysia)
- Mauritanian People's Party (French: Parti du peuple mauritanien, 1960–1978)
- Parry People Movers, UK flywheel vehicle manufacturer
- Pashtun Tahafuz Movement, a human rights movement in Pakistan for the Pashtun people
- People's Monarchist Party (Portugal) (Portuguese: Partido Popular Monárquico), a Portuguese political party
- People's Progressive Movement (Cayman Islands)
- Progressive Party of Maldives

== Science and technology ==
=== Computing ===
- Pages per minute, a measurement of printing speed
- Perl package manager, for software packages
- Planted partition model, a special case of Stochastic block model
- Portable pixmap format, a Netpbm format
- Prediction by partial matching, a data compression technique

=== Medicine ===
- Permanent pacemaker
- Persistent pupillary membrane, an eye condition
- Physician practice management

=== Other uses in science and technology ===
- Parts-per-million
- Peak programme meter, measuring audio level
- Planned preventative maintenance of equipment
- PPM Star Catalogue
- Proton precession magnetometer, measures small magnetic field variations
- Pulse-position modulation of a signal

== Other uses ==
- Pepsi Venezuela Music Awards (Spanish: Premios Pepsi Music Venezuela)
- Peter, Paul and Mary, American folk group
- Portable People Meter, to measure radio and TV broadcast audiences
- Precision Performance Motorsports, an American auto racing team
- Prince Philip movement, a religious sect in Vanuatu
- Private Placement Memorandum, offering document for private placements
- Pay per 1000 impressions

== See also ==
- Temperature coefficient, in parts per million per Kelvin (ppm/K) or per degree Celsius (ppm/C)
