= Pkm =

Pkm or PKM may refer to:

- PKM (gene)
- Pressur-kilometre or pkm, a unit of passenger transportation quantity
- Personal knowledge management
- PKM machine gun, a general-purpose machine gun designed in the Soviet Union
- PKMzeta, protein kinase C zeta type
- PKM, the station code for Pakenham railway station, Victoria, Australia
- PKM, the IATA code for Port Kaituma Airport
- Pomeranian Metropolitan Railway
- Poznań Metropolitan Railway
- Pokemon
