= PNF =

PNF may refer to:

== Places ==
- Nature Park of Faial, on Faial, Azores, Portugal
- Nature Park of Flores, on Flores, Azores, Portugal
- Penyffordd railway station, Wales

== Science and mathematics ==
- Proprioceptive neuromuscular facilitation stretching, a form of static stretching exercise
- Prenex normal form, in predicate calculus
- Primary nonfunction in liver transplantation

== Other uses ==
- National Fascist Party (Partito Nazionale Fascista), Italy
- Pakistan Netball Federation
- Pilot not flying
- People's National Front
