= PHF =

PHF is a three letter acronym meaning:

- Paired Helical Filaments, a term for aggregations of protein in the brain, in conditions such as Alzheimer's disease
- The Pakistan Hockey Federation, national governing body for field hockey
- Patrick Henry Field, the IATA code for the Newport News/Williamsburg International Airport
- Perfect Hair Forever, an American animated television comedy
- Perfect hash function, a set of hash functions which generate no collisions.
- Potentially Hazardous Food, a food safety classification
- Potomac Horse Fever, an illness affecting horses caused by Neorickettsia risticii.
- Premier Hockey Federation, a professional women's ice hockey league located in the United States & Canada.
- Public Health Foundation
- Putting Hartlepool First, a localist English political party based in Hartlepool.
