= PNAC =

PNAC may refer to:

- Project for the New American Century, former US-based think tank
- Pontifical North American College, America's Seminary in Rome
- Pakistan National Accreditation Council

== See also ==
- IEEE 802.1X, an IEEE Standard for port-based Network Access Control (PNAC)
