= PLCC =

PLCC may refer to:

- Plastic leaded chip carrier
- Power-line carrier communication
- Pearson's linear correlation coefficient
- Private-label credit card
