= PPO =

PPO may refer to:

== Law enforcement ==
- Personal protection officer
- Personal protection order
- Police protection order
- Prisons and Probation Ombudsman
- Public prosecutor's office

== Chemistry and biochemistry ==
- 2,5-Diphenyloxazole, an organic scintillator
- Polyphenol oxidases, a family of enzymes
- Poly(p-phenylene oxide), a type of plastic
- Propylene oxide, an industrial chemical
- Protoporphyrinogen oxidase, an enzyme
- Pure plant oil

== Other uses ==
- White House Presidential Personnel Office, the White House office tasked with vetting new appointees
- Preferred Provider Organization, a type of health insurance
- Pfadfinder und Pfadfinderinnen Österreichs, an Austrian Scouting organization
- Planned purchase order, part of the purchasing process
- Polish Patent Office
- Political Parties Order, 2002, a chief executive order in Pakistan
- Toray Pan Pacific Open, a Women's Tennis Association tournament
- Philippine Philharmonic Orchestra
- Abbreviation of Praefectus Praetorio (Praetorian Prefect), found on inscriptions
- Proximal Policy Optimization, a family of reinforcement learning algorithms (part of computer science)
- Populist Party Ontario, a minor provincial political party in Ontario, Canada
- Plant Phenology Ontology
