= PBX =

PBX may refer to:

- Pakubuwono X, the tenth Susuhunan of Surakarta in Java, Indonesia
- Polymer-bonded explosive
- Pre-B-cell leukemia homeobox
- Private branch exchange, a telephone exchange that serves a particular business or office
- PBX Funicular Intaglio Zone, a 2012 album by John Frusciante
- PBX, a rewrite of the Project Builder IDE for Mac OS X systems, now known as Xcode
- PhotoBox, a digital photo printing service
