= PBD =

PBD, pbd or PbD may refer to:

- .pbd, a computer file name extension for PowerBuilder
- Butyl PBD. a fluorescent organic compound
- Conservative Democratic Party of Switzerland (French: Parti bourgeois démocratique suisse, Italian: Partito Borghese Democratico Svizzero, Romansh: Partida burgais democratica Svizra PBD)
- Pacific Bell Directory
- Pacific black duck, a dabbling duck
- Pale Blue Dot, a photograph of Earth made by Voyager 1, and
  - Pale Blue Dot (book), a 1994 book by Carl Sagan
  - Pale Blue Dot (album), a 2008 album by Benn Jordan
- Patrick Bet-David (born 1978), American businessman and podcaster
- Pediatric bipolar disorder, that is, bipolar disorder in children
- Peroxisome biogenesis disorders, a group of rare and severe congenital disorders
- Peterbald, a cat bred
- Porbandar Airport (IATA: PBD), Gujarat, India
- Pravasi Bharatiya Divas, a celebratory day in India
- Programming by demonstration (PbD), a technique to create automated tasks for computers and robots without using a programming language
- PbD, privacy by design, an approach to data protection
- Pyrrolobenzodiazepine, a medical compound
- Southwest Papua, province in Indonesia abbreviated as Papua Barat Daya or Pabaya
