= PLW =

PLW may refer to:

- Palau, country code
- Palawan (province), ISO-3166 code for the Philippine province
- Mutiara Airport (IATA Code PLW), an airport near Palu, Indonesia
- Pelaw Metro station (Tyne and Wear Metro station code PLW), a railway station in Gateshead, England
- PLW Entertainment, an Australian music production company
- Pollokshields West railway station (National Rail station code PLW), a railway station in Glasgow, Scotland
- Power League Wrestling, an American independent professional wrestling promotion
