= PPLI =

Dhheh PPLI may refer to:

- Professional Programme learning Institute,
- Payampersa Language Institute, ppli.ir,
- Precise Participant Location and Identification, a Link 16 functional area,
- Private placement life insurance
- Pennsylvania Preparedness Leadership Institute
- Princess Patricia Light Infantry, a Canadian Army Regiment
