= Power forward (disambiguation) =

Power forward is a position in basketball.

Power forward may also refer to:

- Power forward (Australian rules football)
- Power forward (ice hockey)
- Power Forward (album), album by Wayne Tisdale
