= PWP =

PWP may stand for:

== Businesses and organizations ==
- Perella Weinberg Partners, an American investment banking firm
- Portfolios with Purpose, a New York City based non-profit organization
- Professional Women Photographers, a New York City based non-profit organization
- Pro Wrestling Pride, a defunct British pro wrestling company
- Provisional World Parliament, a transitional international legislative body

== Politics ==
- Peasants and Workers Party of India, an Indian regional political party
- People's Will Party, a Syrian political party

== Other ==
- People (or person) with Parkinson's disease
- Permanent wilting point, in soil physics, the minimum water content for plants to not wilt
- Plasticized white phosphorus, a type of smoke ordnance fill
- Population White Paper, a suggestion about immigration in Singapore
- Pore water pressure, in soil mechanics, a measure of water pressure in soil/rocks
- Pulmonary wedge pressure, a way to measure the left atrial pressure in the heart
