= Pro-opiomelanocortin converting enzyme =

Identifiers
- EC no.: 3.4.23.17
- CAS no.: 80891-34-5

Databases
- IntEnz: IntEnz view
- BRENDA: BRENDA entry
- ExPASy: NiceZyme view
- KEGG: KEGG entry
- MetaCyc: metabolic pathway
- PRIAM: profile
- PDB structures: RCSB PDB PDBe PDBsum
Search
- PMC: articles
- PubMed: articles
- NCBI: proteins

Pro-opiomelanocortin converting enzyme (EC 3.4.23.17, prohormone converting enzyme, pro-opiomelanocortin-converting enzyme, proopiomelanocortin proteinase, PCE) is an enzyme. This enzyme catalyses the following chemical reaction

Cleavage at paired basic residues in certain prohormones, either between them, or on the carboxyl side

This membrane-bound enzyme is isolated from cattle pituitary secretory vesicle.
