= PLD =

PLD may refer to:

== Political parties ==
- Partido de la Liberación Dominicana (Dominican Liberation Party)
- Party for Liberties and Development (Parti pour les Libertés et le Développement), Chad
- Liberal Democratic Party (Angola)
- Liberal Democratic Party (Italy)
- Liberal Democratic Party (Romania)
- Liberal Democratic Pole

== Science and technology ==
- Pegylated liposomal doxorubicin, a pegylated liposomal form of the anticancer medication doxorubicin
- Phospholipase D, an enzyme which cleaves phosphatidylcholine to produce phosphatidic acid and choline
- PLD Space, a Spanish space company focused on developing low cost launch vehicles
- Polycystic liver disease, multiple cysts scattered throughout the normal liver tissue
- Programmable logic device, a type of integrated circuit semiconductor
- Pulsed laser deposition, a method of growing thin films
- Primary linguistic data, Chomsky's term for one's experiences of language during childhood.

== Other uses ==
- Paul Laurence Dunbar High School (disambiguation), several schools
- Pierre-Luc Dubois, ice hockey player for the Washington Capitals
- The ISO 639 language code for Polari
- Product Liability Directive 1985, an EU directive that created a regime of strict liability for defective products
- The stock symbol for Prologis, a real estate investment trust
- Purushottam Laxman Deshpande, Marathi writer and humourist.
- Portslade railway station, a railway station in Sussex, England (station code: PLD)
- Personal Listening Device, such as mp3 players, smartphones etc.
