= PW =

PW may refer to:

== Arts and media ==
- PW (rapper) (born 1992), English hip-hop artist
- Metal Gear Solid: Peace Walker, a 2010 video game
- Pauly-Wissowa, a short name for the Realencyclopädie der classischen Altertumswissenschaft
- Pee Wee (singer) (born 1988), Mexican American singer and actor
- Perfect World (video game), an online roleplaying game
- Persistent world, a type of virtual world
- Philadelphia Weekly, a newspaper
- Practical Wireless, a UK-based amateur radio magazine
- Production Workshop, a Brown University theater
- Publishers Weekly, a trade magazine
- Palworld, a 2024 survival video game

== Businesses and organizations ==
- Warsaw University of Technology, Politechnika Warszawska, a university in Poland
- Price Waterhouse, an accounting firm
- Pratt & Whitney, an aerospace manufacturer
- Protest Warrior, a political activist group
- Physics Wallah, an online and offline education platform

=== Transportation ===
- Pacific Western Transportation, a bus transport company
- Providence and Worcester Railroad (reporting mark PW)
- Precision Air (IATA code PW), a current Tanzanian airline
- German Wings (IATA code PW), a 1983-1990 German airline
- Pacific Western Airlines (IATA code PW), a 1946-1987 Canadian airline

== Places ==
- Palau (ISO code PW), an island nation
- Puerto Williams, a port in Chile

== Science and technology ==
- .pw, the Internet domain for Palau
- Password, a code for authentication
- Pathetic Writer, a word processor software application
- Pennyweight, a unit of mass
- Petawatt (PW), a unit of power
- Picowatt (pW), a unit of power
- Precipitable water, a meteorological measure of the amount of water in the atmosphere
- Pseudo-wire, in computer networking and telecommunications

== Other uses ==
- P. W. Botha (1916–2006), prime minister of South Africa
- Prisoner of war, a legal status in warfare
- Paul Walker (1973-2013), actor known for the Fast And Furious franchise.
- Kotwica, a World War II emblem of the Polish Underground State and Armia Krajowa.
