= PHQ =

PHQ may refer to:

- Patient Health Questionnaire
- Postal Headquarters card - PHQ card
- The Monument Airport, IATA airport code "PHQ"
