= PBT =

PBT may refer to:

== Science, technology and medicine ==
- Paul–Bunnell test, an heterophile antibody test
- Pentabromotoluene, an aromatic chemical compound
- Persistent, bioaccumulative and toxic substances, a class of compounds that have high resistance to degradation
- Polybutylene terephthalate, plastic used as an electrical insulator
- Proton beam therapy, a cancer treatment
- Provider Backbone Transport, IEEE 802.1 networking technology
- Preliminary breath test, with a hand-held breathalyzer
- Property-based testing, a software testing framework; for example see QuickCheck

== Education ==
- Paper-based testing, such as TOEFL

== Other uses ==
- Permian Basin Royalty Trust (NYSE symbol)
- Profit before tax, a variation of EBIT
- Progressing Ballet Technique, a form of cross training used for ballet that is uses ballet specific exercises similar to Pilates
- Pittsburgh Ballet Theatre, a ballet company in Pennsylvania, US
- "PBT", a song by Travis Scott, Tyla and Vybz Kartel from the 2025 album JackBoys 2
