= PRT =

PRT may refer to:

== Arts and media ==
- PRT Records, a 1980s British record label
- PRT Company Limited (formerly Prime Media Group), Australia
- Poor Righteous Teachers, an American hip hop group
- Power Rangers Turbo, the fifth season of the Power Rangers TV series
- Parahuman Response Team, a fictional agency in the Worm web series

== Government and politics ==
=== Political parties ===
- Partido Revolucionario de los (y las) Trabajadores (in Spanish)
  - Workers' Revolutionary Party (Argentina)
  - Revolutionary Workers' Party (Mexico)
  - Workers' Revolutionary Party (Nicaragua)
  - Workers' Revolutionary Party (Peru)
- Workers' Revolutionary Party (Portugal) (Portuguese: Partido Revolucionário dos Trabalhadores)

=== Other uses in government and politics ===
- Portugal (ISO 3166: PRT)
- Petroleum Revenue Tax, a direct British tax on oilfields
- Prison Reform Trust, a British campaigning charity
- Provincial Reconstruction Team, form of US-led unit in Afghanistan and Iraq

== Technology ==
- Platinum resistance thermometer
- Precomputed Radiance Transfer, a technique for computer graphics
- Puerto Rico Telephone Company

== Transport ==
- Personal rapid transit, a mode of transport
- Pittsburgh Regional Transit, an American state agency
- Prestatyn railway station, Wales (CRS code: PRT)

== Other uses ==
- Pain reprocessing therapy, a treatment method for curing pain
- Pivotal response therapy, for autism
- Prerequisite Tree, a thinking process in the Theory of Constraints
- Preterite, a tense–aspect in grammar
- Pinnacle Motorsport (Filipino auto racing team) formerly PRT Racing, a Filipino auto racing team
