= PANS =

PANS can refer to:

- Panin Sekuritas, ticker symbol for Indonesia Stock Exchange
- Pediatric acute-onset neuropsychiatric syndrome
- Parasympathetic nervous system (Parasympathetic Autonomic Nervous System)
- PANS-OPS (Procedures for Air Navigation Services), ICAO)
- Peripheral autonomic nervous system
- Positive and Negative Syndrome Scale
