= POG =

POG or Pog may refer to:

== Arts, entertainment, and media ==
- Pogs, a 1990s children's game, as well as the disk-shaped cardboard game pieces used in that game
- Pillars of Garendall (PoG), a role-playing video game
- PogChamp, an emote and internet meme originating on Twitch
- PogChamps, an online chess tournament
- "Pog", an Alan Moore-written issue of Swamp Thing paying homage to Walt Kelly's comic strip Pogo
- One of the two title characters in Pib and Pog, an animated short film created by Aardman Animations

== Businesses and organizations ==
- Pog (drink) (passion fruit-orange-guava), a tropical juice drink
- Pediatric Oncology Group, a former U.S. and Canadian clinical trial cooperative group
- Pittsburgh Organizing Group, a former Pittsburgh, Pennsylvania, US-based anarchist organization
- Galician Workers' Party (Galician: Partido Obreiro Galego, POG), a political party in Galicia, Spain

== Military ==
- Person Other than Grunt, pejorative US military slang to describe someone serving in a non-combat position.

== Science and technology ==
- Pan-STARRS Optical Galaxy Survey (theSkyNet POGS), an astronomy research project
- PHP Object Generator, a type of object–relational mapping software
- Polyphonic Octave Generator, a pedal for pitch shift effects in musical instruments

== Other uses ==
- POG FC (Port-Gentil FC), a Gabonese association football team
- The Pogs, an Australian beat music group
- Planogram, visual representations of a store's products or services
- Portage station, Wisconsin, United States, station code POG

== See also ==
- The Pogues, Celtic punk band founded in London in 1982
