= PBS (disambiguation) =

PBS is the Public Broadcasting Service, a nonprofit television service in the United States.

PBS, pbs, or PBs may also refer to:

== Arts and media ==
=== Broadcasting ===
==== Public Broadcasting Service(s) ====
- PBS Kids, an American children's programming brand
- PBS America, a British free-to-air television channel
- Public Broadcasting Services, Malta
- Thai Public Broadcasting Service, Thai TV station

==== Other broadcasters ====
- PBS 106.7FM, a community radio station in Melbourne, Australia
- Pacific Broadcasting System, a Filipino radio network
- Palestine Broadcasting Service (1936–1948), British Mandate for Palestine
- People's Broadcasting Service, a Filipino radio network, managed by Bombo Radyo Philippines
- Presidential Broadcast Service, a Filipino government-owned radio network
- Progressive Broadcasting System (early 1950s), a defunct American radio network

=== Literature ===
- Poetry Book Society, founded in 1953 in the United Kingdom
- Prayer Book Society of Canada
- Prayer Book Society of the USA (PBS USA)
- Pearls Before Swine (comic strip), an American comic strip

=== Music ===
- Positive Black Soul, a Senegalese hip-hop group

See also: Public Service Broadcasting (band), an English musical group

== Science, technology, and business ==
=== Physics, chemistry, and medicine ===
- Polarizing beam splitter, a component in experimental optics
- Lead(II) sulfide (PbS), an inorganic compound
- Polybutylene succinate, a synthetic polyester
- Sodium perborate (NaH_{2}BO_{4}), a white, odorless, water-soluble chemical compound
- Phosphate-buffered saline, a buffer solution commonly used in biological research
- Primer binding site, a region of a nucleotide sequence
- Prune belly syndrome, a medical condition
- Positive behavior support, a substantiated form of applied behavior analysis

=== Computing and administration ===
- Proxmox Backup Server, a Linux distribution for backup of virtual machines, containers, and physical hosts
- Portable Batch System, a computer software that performs job scheduling
- Preferential bidding system, a computer system for employee work-duty bidding
- Product breakdown structure, a project-management tool

=== Transportation ===
- PBS Velká Bíteš, a Czech aircraft engine company
- Privatbanen Sønderjylland, a former Danish railway operator

== Communities ==
- Pacific Bulb Society, an international nonprofit focused on flowering bulbs and other geophytes
- Pink Boots Society, supporting women working in brewing
- Swiss Guide and Scout Movement (German: Pfadibewegung Schweiz)
- Playboys 13 Gang (PBS13), a street gang centered around Los Angeles, California, United States

== Government ==
- Pharmaceutical Benefits Scheme, an Australian Government subsidy for prescription medication
- Pakistan Bureau of Statistics
- Public Buildings Service, of the US General Services Administration

== Languages ==
- Proto-Balto-Slavic language, a reconstructed proto-language
- Central Pame language (ISO 639-3 code: pbs) of Santa María Acapulco, San Luis Potosí, Mexico, in the Oto-Manguean family

== Other uses ==
- Parti Bersatu Sabah, a Malaysian political party

== See also ==
- PB (disambiguation)
