= POTC =

POTC may refer to:

- potC RNA motif, an RNA structure
- Pirates of the Caribbean, a Disney franchise
- Philippine Overseas Telecommunications Corporation
- 1st Pursuit Organization and Training Center, at Villeneuve-les-Vertus Aerodrome, 1918
