= PARP =

PARP may refer to:

- Poly ADP ribose polymerase, an enzyme
- Procyclic acidic repetitive protein, a type of protein in Trypanosoma parasites
- Parp (onomatopoeic), a sound
