= PAFC =

PAFC may refer to:

== Association football (soccer) clubs ==
- Peasedown Athletic F.C., Somerset, England
- Penicuik Athletic F.C., near Edinburgh, Scotland
- Penrith A.F.C., Cumbria, England
- Penryn Athletic F.C., Cornwall, England
- Penzance A.F.C., Cornwall, England
- Philippine Army F.C., Philippines
- Plymouth Argyle F.C., Devon, England
- Preston Athletic F.C., near Edinburgh, Scotland
- Puskás Akadémia FC, Fejér County, Hungary

== Other meanings ==
- Phosphoric acid fuel cell
- Photoacoustic flow cytometry, a biomedical imaging modality
- Ping An Finance Centre, skyscraper in Shenzhen, Guangdong, China
- Port Adelaide Football Club, South Australia, an Australian rules club
