= PFW =

PFW may refer to the following:

- Paris Fashion Week
- Pfalz Flugzeugwerke, a German aircraft manufacturer
- Pittsburgh Fair Witness, a 1970s counterculture newspaper
- Pro Football Weekly, an American sports magazine
- Purdue University Fort Wayne, a public university in Fort Wayne, Indiana
- Project Forth Works, a wiki containing lots of open source programs & algorithms written in Forth
