= Pub (disambiguation) =

A pub is a public house or bar.

Pub or PUB may also refer to:

- Pub (Đorđe Balašević album), a 1982 album by Serbian singer-songwriter Đorđe Balašević album
- Pub (Denzil album), a 1994 album by British band Denzil
- PUB (file type), a Microsoft Publisher document file format
  - .pub, a Microsoft Publishing file extension
- PUB (Stockholm), a department store in Stockholm
- Princeton University Band, the marching band and pep band of Princeton University
- Public Utilities Board (Singapore), Singapore's national water agency
- Publication
- Pueblo Memorial Airport, in Colorado, US
- The principle of uniform boundedness, in mathematics

== See also ==
- Pub rock (disambiguation)
- Public (disambiguation)
- Publix, a supermarket chain
- PubMed, a scientific research resource
