= PWV =

PWV may refer to:

- Parama Weera Vibhushanaya, a military decoration Sri Lanka
- Pretoria-Witwatersrand-Vereeniging, now Gauteng, a province of South Africa. Also the name of Gauteng province for a short time, and the name of a region in the defunct Transvaal province that became Gauteng
- Pittsburgh and West Virginia Railway, a former railroad running from West Virginia to Pittsburgh
- Pulse wave velocity
