= PWC =

PWC may refer to:

== Organisations ==
- Agility Logistics, formerly Public Warehousing Co
- Philippine Women's College, former name of Philippine Women's University, a co-educational institution in Davao City, Philippines
- PowerWater, formerly Power and Water Corporation, government owned corporation in the Northern Territory, Australia
- Pratt & Whitney Canada, a manufacturer of small turboprops and turbofans
- Prince of Wales' College, Moratuwa, a boys' school in Moratuwa, Sri Lanka
- Prince of Wales College, a defunct university college in Charlottetown, Prince Edward Island, Canada
- PwC, or PricewaterhouseCoopers, a Big Four accounting firm

== Other uses ==
- Paragliding World Cup, a paragliding competition
- Pembroke Welsh Corgi, a dog breed
- Personal water craft, a recreational watercraft
- Pokémon World Championships, an annual global esports tournament for the Pokémon media franchise
- Pirelli World Challenge, a North American auto racing series
- Prince William County, Virginia, US
- Proto-West Caucasian, sometimes used for the reconstructed proto-language of the Northwest Caucasian languages
- PWC, a catalogue of the musical works of Pachelbel
