= PCL =

PCL may refer to:

== Aviation ==
- FAP Captain David Abenzur Rengifo International Airport, near Pucallpa, Peru (IATA code: PCL)
- Pilot-controlled lighting, a system by which aircraft pilots can control the lighting of runways and taxiways via radio control
- Pocket check list, a pilot's check list used by the U.S. Navy

== Organizations ==
- Pacific Coast League, a Class Triple-A league in minor league baseball
- Pacific Coast Professional Football League, an American football league (1940–1948)
- Workers' Communist Party (Italy), an Italian political party established in 2006
- Portage County League, a high school sports league in northeastern Ohio, now called the Portage Trail Conference
- Philadelphia Catholic League, a Catholic high school sports league in Philadelphia and surrounding suburbs
- Philippine Councilors League, an organization in the Philippines with city and municipal councilors as members
- PCL Construction, a general contracting organization in Canada and the United States
- Physical Chemistry Laboratory, University of Oxford, England

== Places ==
- Parkway Central Library, the main public library in Philadelphia, Pennsylvania
- Perry–Castañeda Library at The University of Texas at Austin
- Polytechnic of Central London, now the University of Westminster

== Science and technology ==
- Passive Coherent Location, or passive radar, a radar system exploiting commercial broadcast signals
- Phosphorus pentachloride, PCl_{5}, and Phosphorus trichloride, PCl_{3}
- Plasma cell leukemia
- Polycaprolactone, a polyester
- Posterior cruciate ligament, a ligament of the knee
- Printer Command Language, Hewlett-Packard
- Psychopathy Checklist, Revised or Hare Psychopathy Checklist, a list of psychopathy diagnostic criteria
- Program Control Language of Presentation (software)
- Point Cloud Library of algorithms
- Proximal Centriole-Like
- Performance Counters for Linux, a Linux performance monitoring tool, now called perf
- PTSD Checklist, a screening test for post-traumatic stress disorder
