= PDT =

PDT may refer to:

== Businesses and organisations ==
- Paramount Domestic Television, United States television series distributor, now CBS Television Distribution
- Piedmont Airlines (ICAO airline code), an American regional airline
- PDT Partners, a hedge fund company in New York City that was formerly the trading division of Morgan Stanley
- Partido Democrático Trabalhista (Democratic Labour Party), a political party of Brazil
- Phi Delta Theta, an international fraternity
- Democratic Labour Party (Brazil), (acronym commonly used is PDT)

== Computing ==
- PHP Development Tools, an IDE plugin for the Eclipse platform
- PDT Standard, a Chinese police wireless communications protocol
- Portable data terminal, a mobile device

== Linguistics ==
- Prague Dependency Treebank, of the Czech National Corpus
- Plautdietsch, spoken in Poland and Mexico (ISO 639-3:pdt)

== Places ==
- Please Don't Tell, a bar in New York City, US
- Eastern Oregon Regional Airport, US (IATA:PDT)

== Science and medicine ==
- Patient-delivered therapy
- Photodynamic therapy, treatment for cancer and wet age-related macular degeneration, involving a photosensitizer, light, and tissue oxygen
- Population doubling time, a number indicating cell growth in cell cultures
- Pancreaticoduodenal transplantation (see Pancreas transplantation)
- 1,3-Propanedithiol, an organosulfur compound

== Other uses ==
- Pacific Daylight Time (UTC−7), daylight saving time in western North America
- Pattern day trader, a previous designation for those following a stock-trading style
- Peter Dengate Thrush, New Zealand barrister
- Potentially dangerous taxpayer, an American taxpayer the IRS fear violence from
