= PBI =

PBI can refer to:

== Classifications ==
- Predominantly Black Institution, a college or university that is not technically an historically black college or university, but primarily serves African Americans

== Organizations ==
- the ICAO code of Pacific Blue Airlines
- the former IATA airport code of President Donald J. Trump International Airport near West Palm Beach, Florida
- Pan Britannica Industries
- Labour Party of Indonesia (Indonesian: Partai Buruh Indonesia), a political party in Indonesia.
- Pastoral Bible Institute
- Peace Brigades International, a non-governmental organization founded in 1981
- Pitney Bowes Inc.'s stock ticker symbol
- Prairie Bible Institute, a Bible college near Three Hills, Alberta
- Polar Bears International
- Public Benevolent Institution, a type of charity in Australia
- Police Bureau of Investigation, a specialized unit of the Bangladesh Police

== Science ==
- Phenylbenzimidazole, a common sunscreen ingredient
- Polybenzimidazole fiber
- Perylene-3,4:9,10-tetracarboxylic acid bisimide, also perylene bisimide or perylene diimide (PDI)

== Technology ==
- Parallel Bus Interface, a 50-pin port found on some Atari 8-bit XL computers
- PBI Regional Medical Center, a hospital in Passaic, New Jersey
- .pbi, a computer filename extension used on by the TrueOS operating system
- Product backlog item, a term used in the Scrum variant of the Agile methodology used for software development
- Power BI, a business intelligence platform by Microsoft, used for reporting and dashboards

== Other ==
- Poor Bloody Infantry, a military slang term.
- Partial basic income, a basic income set at a level that is less than enough to meet a person's basic needs
