= PKA =

PKA may refer to:

- Napaskiak Airport (IATA code), airport in Napaskiak, Alaska
- Professionally known as:
  - Pen name
  - Stage persona
- pK_{a}, the symbol for the acid dissociation constant at logarithmic scale
- Protein kinase A, a class of cAMP-dependent enzymes
- Pi Kappa Alpha, the North-American social fraternity
- Public key authentication, establishing key authenticity in public-key cryptography
- Professional Karate Association
- Primary knock-on atom, an atom that is displaced from its lattice site by irradiation
- Painkiller Already, a podcast featuring FPSRussia
- Pentax K_{A}-mount, a camera lens mount

== Non-Latin ==
- The Latin letters PKA are visually similar to the Cyrillic acronym РКА, the Russian Federal Space Agency
