= Papi =

Papi or PAPI may refer to:

== Places ==
- Papi District, an administrative subdivision of Iran
- Papı, a village in Azerbaijan
- Papi Hills, Andhra Pradesh, India

== Arts and entertainment ==
- "Papi" (Jennifer Lopez song), a 2011 song by Jennifer Lopez from Love?
- Papi (Dean Blunt song), 2013
- "Papi", a track from the album Straight Outta Oz by Todrick Hall
- Papi (The L Word character), a character in the TV series The L Word
- Papi (2018 film), a Belgian-Ugandan-French film
- Papi (2020 film), a Dominican surrealist drama film
- Papi, a character from the Japanese manga series Monster Musume

== PAPI ==
- Performance Application Programming Interface in computer science
- Personality and Preference Inventory, a personality measure designed for the workplace
- Precision approach path indicator, a visual guidance system for aircraft pilots

== Other uses ==
- Papi (name), including a list of people with the name
- Papi language, spoken in a single village in Papua New Guinea

== See also ==
- Paapi, a 1977 Indian film by O. P. Ralhan
- Paapi - Ek Satya Katha, a 2013 Indian film by Aziz Sejawal
