= PAB =

PAB may refer to:

== Companies and organizations ==
- Pennsylvania Association of Broadcasters
- Pickleball Association Bermuda
- Ping An Bank
- Planning Accreditation Board

== Places ==
- Bilaspur Airport (IATA airport code)
- Parker Center, formerly the Police Administration Building for the Los Angeles Police Department
- Port aux Basques, a town in the Canadian province of Newfoundland and Labrador

== Science and medicine ==
- Poly(A)-binding protein
- Polyclonal antibody
- Pseudobulbar affect, a disorder of the expression of emotion

== Other ==
- Panamanian balboa, ISO 4217 currency code
- Patent Appeal Board, an administrative body within the Canadian Intellectual Property Office
- Pay-as-bid auction
