= PGM =

PGM may refer to:

== Math and science ==
- Phosphoglucomutase, an enzyme that interconverts G6P and G1P
- Phosphoglycerate mutase, an enzyme that catalyses step 8 of glycolysis
- Platinum group metals, six metallic elements grouped together on the periodic table of the elements
- Probabilistic graphical model, which can be directed or undirected

== Computers ==
- Portable Graymap File Format, a Netpbm format file format for images
- Pragmatic General Multicast, an Internet transport protocol for reliable multicast

== Military and navy ==
- Precision-guided munition, a term for a guided weapon
- PGM Précision, a French precision weapon maker
- A US Navy hull classification symbol: Patrol motor gunboat (PGM)

== Music ==
- Ibanez PGM, the signature guitar model of Paul Gilbert
- Playground Music Scandinavia, a Swedish record label

== Other ==
- Greek Magical Papyri, a collection of ancient texts also known as the Papyri Graecae Magicae
- Past Grand Master, the former head of the Grand Masonic lodge
- Provincial Grand Master (PGM or PrGM), the ruler of an internal masonic province
- Honda's programmed fuel injection system
- PolyGame Master, an arcade system board made by IGS
- PGM Inspection Company
- Proto-Germanic, the reconstructed ancestor of all Germanic languages
