= Pedestrian Accessibility and Movement Environment Laboratory =

Former research facility in London

Coordinates: 51.56016°N 0.13309°W

The Pedestrian Accessibility and Movement Environment Laboratory (PAMELA) was a research facility located in Upper Holloway, part of the University College London in the United Kingdom.

It was designed to study human interactions in controlled conditions by replicating real-world environments such as urban streets and public parks. The laboratory had an 80-square-metre (860 sq ft) artificial pavement platform which was used to simulate everyday scenarios, from different types of pedestrians to varying pavement conditions. Its experiments were intended to create safer streets and more user-friendly public spaces.

PAMELA in Upper Holloway was replaced by PEARL (Person-Environment-Activity Research Laboratory) in the London East Business and Technical Park, Dagenham.

== See also ==
- Safety engineering
- NIST stone test wall
