= PSE Archery =

- Headquarters: Tucson, Arizona
- Products: Archery equipment

PSE Archery, LLC is an American archery supply company, and a designer and manufacturer of compound bows, arrows, and other equipment. The company was founded by Pete Shepley in Mahomet, Illinois, and has its corporate headquarters in Tucson, Arizona. PSE Archery is one of the leading bow manufacturers in the world, its products are widely used in many fields including hunting and sports.

== History ==
PSE, short for Precision Shooting Equipment, was founded by Pete Shepley, a product engineer of Magnavox, as a part-time pursuit. Shepley was a specialist in creating archery equipment and created the company in 1970 to manufacture his own products. PSE was one of five companies to have produced the first compound bows.

PSE was acquired in February 2023 from the former owner Pete Shepley by Heritage Outdoor Group, a newly-formed investment holding company designed to acquire existing outdoor brands.

== Products ==
PSE is known for producing high-performance bows. In 2014 the Full Throttle was introduced and was the fastest bow on the market at that time, with IBO (International Bowhunters Organization) speeds of 370 fps.
