= PCTE Group of Institutes =

Educational institution

PCTE Group of Institutes is a group of five private colleges in two campuses in Ludhiana, Punjab, India. All the courses offered by PCTE is affiliated with Punjab Technical University (PTU).

== History and organization ==
In 1999, the Punjab Management Education Trust established the Punjab College of Technical Education to provide management and IT education in the region. Since then, PCTE has expanded into Pharmacy, Biotechnology, Medical Lab Sciences, Airlines, Tourism, Hotel Management, Fashion Designing, Journalism and Mass Communication and Engineering.

PCTE publishes the PCTE Journal of Business Management and PCTE Journal of Computer Sciences. PCTE also edits the quarterly journal, M-World, for the Ludhiana Management Association, addressing management issues.

== Awards & rankings ==
- Asia's Best B-School Leadership Award by CMO Council, USA at Suntec, Singapore in 2010.
- Innovation Leadership Award by CMO Council, USA at Suntec, Singapore in 2010.
- Most Outstanding B-School of North India by Dainik Bhaskar B-School Leadership Awards at HRD World Congress in 2010.
- Best B-School Innovation Award by DNA in 2010.
- Best B-School Leadership Award by DNA in 2010.
- Ranked 38th among private B-Schools in India by Outlook in 2010.
- "B-School that encourages leadership as part of curriculum" award by 17th Dewang Mehta B-School Excellence Award in association with B School Affaire in 2009.
- Rated after top 7 B-School on the basis of Intellectual Capital by Indian Management Journal of All India Management Association in 2009.
- Rated as the best business school in Punjab, Himachal Pradesh and J&K by the Competition Success Review and Indian Management Journal of All India Management Association for the 7th time consecutively in 2009.
- Business India rated PCTE in the A category in 2004, then the A+ category in 2008, and the A++ category in 2009.
- Business World ranked PCTE as 12th on Learning Experience basis and 31st on International Exposure among top business schools of India in 2007.
- Graded as an "A"-grade business school by the All India Management Association (AIMA) for multiple years in a row.

== International conferences ==
Since 2004, PCTE has organized international conferences in several Indian states and Bangladesh, Iran, Malaysia, Pakistan, Saudi Arabia, Sri Lanka, Tunisia, and the United Kingdom – have presented their research papers in Business Management and IT. These conferences have provided platforms for industry and academics to share and discuss trends and technologies for the development of manpower.

== International links ==
PCTE has signed nine MOUs (Memoranda of Understanding, or agreements of cooperation) with institutions in Bangladesh, United Kingdom, Mozambique, Pakistan, Sri Lanka, Sudan, and South Africa. Seven faculty members teaching in a university in Mozambique joined PCTE for the academic session 2010–2011. PCTE has a number of agreements with foreign universities. Some are meant to facilitate research and faculty/scholar exchange, while others include student exchange as part of a wider MoU.

PCTE has attracted students from Afghanistan, Ghana, Mozambique, Rwanda, South Africa, Tanzania, Uganda, and Zimbabwe – along with a research scholar from Cameroon.

== Student activities ==
PCTE was listed in the Limca Book of Records 2005, for being the only business school to give its students hand-on knowledge about Indian stock market. its . The students pool funds and invest in the market. A portfolio of scrips is planned and managed by the students every year, who are themselves responsible for all decisions regarding the buying and selling of scrips. They manage all financial activities related to bank account, financial decisions and D-mat account.

Koshish is cultural and literary event, held in the month of September–October every year. Classes compete among themselves in varied events to lift the overall trophy. As many as 2,000 PCTE students participate each year in different cultural and literary events.

Ehsaas is PCTE's international, inter-institutional cultural-cum-literary festival. Since year 2000, it has been organized multiple times both in India and in Pakistan. Events at Ehsaas may include a car rally, "dumb charades, face painting", "a fashion show, folk and western dances, solo and duet singing, mime, one act plays, fusion music, poetry etc." At Ehsaas 2006, 700 students participated on four teams from Pakistan – NCBA & E-Lahore, FAST-Peshawar, IQRA-Islamabad, and SZABIST-Islamabad. 25 professional institutes in India and around 6000 visitors attended the event.

The Institute of Hotel Management at PCTE also organizes a food festival called Daawat-e-Khas. The event combines ethnic foods of India – both popular dishes and unusual fare – with live music.
