= Patent and Trademark Office =

The Patent and Trademark Office may refer to:

- United States Patent and Trademark Office (USPTO)
- German Patent and Trademark Office (DPMA)
- Danish Patent and Trademark Office (DKPTO)
- Italian Patent and Trademark Office (UIBM)
- Spanish Patent and Trademark Office (SPTO or OEPM)
- Swedish Patent and Registration Office
