= Phenylalanine/tyrosine ammonia-lyase =

Identifiers
- EC no.: 4.3.1.25

Databases
- IntEnz: IntEnz view
- BRENDA: BRENDA entry
- ExPASy: NiceZyme view
- KEGG: KEGG entry
- MetaCyc: metabolic pathway
- PRIAM: profile
- PDB structures: RCSB PDB PDBe PDBsum
Search
- PMC: articles
- PubMed: articles
- NCBI: proteins

Phenylalanine/tyrosine ammonia-lyase (EC 4.3.1.25, PTAL, bifunctional PAL) is an enzyme with systematic name L-phenylalanine(or L-tyrosine):trans-cinnamate(or trans-p-hydroxycinnamate) ammonia-lyase. This enzyme catalyses the following chemical reaction

(1) L-phenylalanine $\rightleftharpoons$ trans-cinnamate + NH_{3}
(2) L- tyrosine $\rightleftharpoons$ trans-p-hydroxycinnamate + NH_{3}

This enzyme is a member of the aromatic amino acid lyase family.
