= Positive material identification =

Positive material identification (PMI) is the analysis of a material, this can be any material but is generally used for the analysis of metallic alloy to establish composition by reading the quantities by percentage of its constituent elements. Typical methods for PMI include X-ray fluorescence (XRF) and optical emission spectrometry (OES).

PMI is a portable method of analysis and can be used in the field on components.

X-ray fluorescence (XRF) PMI cannot detect small elements such as carbon. This means that when undertaking analysis of stainless steels such as grades 304 and 316 the low carbon 'L' variant can not be determined. This however can be analysed with optical emission spectrometry (OES)
