= Preimplantation genetic haplotyping =

Preimplantation genetic haplotyping (PGH) is a clinical method of preimplantation genetic diagnosis (PGD) used to determine the presence of single gene disorders in offspring. PGH provides a more feasible method of gene location than whole-genome association experiments, which are expensive and time-consuming.

PGH differs from common PGD methods such as fluorescence in situ hybridization (FISH) and polymerase chain reaction (PCR) for two primary reasons. First, rather than focusing on the genetic makeup of an embryo PGH compares the genome of affected and unaffected members of previous generations. This examination of generational variation then allows for a haplotype of genetic markers statistically associated with the target disease to be identified, rather than searching merely for a mutation. PGH is often used to reinforce other methods of genetic testing, and is considered more accurate than certain more common PGD methods because it has been found to reduce risk of misdiagnoses. Studies have found that misdiagnoses due to allele dropout (ADO), one of the most common causes of interpretation error, can be almost eliminated through use of PGH. Further, in the case of mutation due to translocation, PGH is able to detect chromosome abnormality to its full extent by differentiating between embryos carrying balanced forms of a translocation versus those carrying the homologous normal chromosomes. This is an advantage because PGD methods such as FISH are able to reveal whether an embryo will express the phenotypic difference, but not whether an embryo may be a carrier. In 2015, PGH was used in conjunction with a whole-genome amplification (WGA) process to not only diagnose disease but also distinguish meiotic segregation errors from mitotic ones.

Studies are being continually performed in an attempt to utilize and improve PGD methods since their initial invention. It has become increasingly popular because it grants individuals the option of detecting embryo abnormalities before implantation, rather than during the beginning weeks of pregnancy. The latter often results in embryo abortion, presenting an ethical dilemma for many that can now be avoided.

== Procedure ==
PGH uses information regarding family history in conjunction with the use of linked polymorphic markers such as short tandem repeats (STRs) and single nucleotide polymorphisms (SNPs) to locate genes responsible for disease. Both STRs and SNPs are variations in gene nucleotides, and it is estimated that there are tens of millions of each type of variation in human DNA. High frequency of STRs or SNPs in alleles of affected individuals in comparison to their unaffected direct relatives indicates the origin of a disease causing mutation. They thus "mark" alleles as having a mutation without having to specifically identify the mutation. Because the number of potential STRs and SNPs is so high, a family pedigree helps to narrow the scope of alleles to analyze. Further, understanding how the gene of interest gets expressed over time helps ultimately determine which haplotype is responsible for the alleles linked to the mutation. A haplotype map is thus created, not only exhibiting genes the offspring will contain, but also the parental origin of the genes. Once the alleles that correlate with a mutation are characterized, PGH of the embryos is possible and only embryos carrying the low risk haplotypes are selected for transfer. PGH is performed in vitro until this point, when the chosen embryos get placed in the uterus of a surrogate mother for further development.

== Advantages ==
Once a panel of associated genetic markers has been established for a particular disease it can be used for all carriers of that disease. In contrast, since even a monogenic disease can be caused by many different mutations within the affected gene, conventional PGD methods based on finding a specific mutation would require mutation-specific tests. Thus, PGH widens the availability of PGD to cases where mutation-specific tests are unavailable.

PGH also has an advantage over fluorescence in situ hybridization (FISH) in that FISH is not usually able to make the differentiation between embryos that possess the balanced form of a chromosomal translocation and those carrying the homologous normal chromosomes. This inability can be seriously harmful to the diagnosis made. PGH can make the distinction that FISH often cannot. PGH does this by using polymorphic markers that are better suited at recognizing translocations. These polymorphic markers are able to distinguish between embryos that carried normal, balanced, and unbalanced translocations. FISH also requires more cell fixation for analysis whereas PGH requires only transfer of cells into polymerase chain reaction tubes. The cell transfer is a simpler method and leaves less room for analysis failure.

== Uses ==
PGH has been used to screen for:

- Cystic fibrosis
- Duchenne muscular dystrophy
- Huntington's disease
- Spinal muscular atrophy
- Alport's syndrome
- Von Hippel–Lindau disease
- Sickle-cell disease
- Hydatidiform mole

== History ==
While PGD was initially carried out to sex rabbits in 1968, human PGD only became available after the development of PCR on a single cell DNA in 1985. PGH was first developed in 2006 at London's Guy's Hospital.
