= PDF (disambiguation) =

PDF, or Portable Document Format, is a file format used to present documents.

PDF, pdf, or PDF file may also refer to:

== Computing and telecommunications ==
- Pop Directional Formatting (Unicode character U+202C), a formatting character in bi-directional formatting
- Printer description file, describing capabilities of PostScript printers
- Profile-directed feedback, a compiler optimization better known as Profile-Guided Optimization (PGO)
- Program Development Facility, in the IBM z/OS operating system
- Powder Diffraction File

== Mathematics ==
- Pair distribution function
- Probability density function
- Probability distribution function (disambiguation)

== Organisations ==
- Parkinson's Disease Foundation, a medical foundation
- PDF Solutions, a company based in San Jose, California
- Peace Development Fund, a non-profit public foundation based in Amherst, Massachusetts

=== Military ===
- Panama Defense Forces
- People's Defence Force (Myanmar), armed wing of the Burmese government-in-exile since 2021
- People's Defence Force (Singapore)
- Permanent Defence Forces, the standing branches of Ireland's military
- Popular Defense Forces (Gaza), a militant group in Gaza
- Popular Defence Forces (Sudan), a paramilitary group in Sudan
- Puntland Dervish Force, Armed force of Puntland

=== Politics ===
- Parti de la France
- People's Democratic Front (Hyderabad), a political party that existed in India during the early 1950s
- Progressive Democratic Front (Andhra Pradesh), a political party in the Indian state of Andhra Pradesh
- Party of Progress (Germany) (Partei des Fortschritts), a political party in Germany founded in 2020
- People's Democratic Front (Burma)
- People's Democratic Front (Indonesia)
- People's Democratic Front (Iran)
- People's Democratic Front (Meghalaya), India
- People's Democratic Front (Romania)
- Popular Democratic Front (Italy)

== Other uses ==
- PDF (gene), a gene that in humans encodes the enzyme peptide deformylase
- Palladium fluoride (PdF), a series of chemical compounds
- Parton distribution function, in particle physics
- Peak draw force, in a compound bow in archery
- Percival David Foundation of Chinese Art
- Pigment dispersing factor, in biology
- Planar deformation features, in geology
- Playa del Fuego, a Delaware art festival
- Postdoctoral fellow
- PDF file, a euphemism of pedophile

== See also ==
- KPDF-CD, a television station in Phoenix, Arizona
- PDF417, or "portable data file 417", a two-dimensional barcode
