= MIDI beat clock =

Clock signal broadcast via MIDI

MIDI beat clock, or simply MIDI clock, is a clock signal that is broadcast via MIDI to ensure that several MIDI-enabled devices such as a synthesizer or music sequencer stay in synchronization. Clock events are sent at a rate of 24 pulses per quarter note. Those pulses are used to maintain a synchronized tempo for synthesizers that have beats-per-minute-dependent voices and also for arpeggiator synchronization.

The clock is presented as a stream of single-byte MIDI messages. Playback at the tempo presented by the beat clock can be started, stopped and resumed with other single-byte MIDI messages. Location information can be specified using Song Position Pointer messages.

MIDI beat clock differs from MIDI timecode in that MIDI beat clock is tempo-dependent.

== Messages ==
MIDI beat clock defines the following real-time messages:

- clock (decimal 248, hex 0xF8)
- start (decimal 250, hex 0xFA)
- continue (decimal 251, hex 0xFB)
- stop (decimal 252, hex 0xFC)

MIDI also specifies a System Common message called Song Position Pointer (SPP). SPP can be used in conjunction with the above real-time messages for complete transport control. This message consists of 3 bytes; a status byte (decimal 242, hex 0xF2), followed by two 7-bit data bytes (least significant byte first) forming a 14-bit value that specifies the number of MIDI beats (1 MIDI beat = a 16th note = 6 clock pulses) since the start of the song. This message only needs to be sent once if a jump to a different position in the song is needed. Thereafter, only real-time clock messages need to be sent to advance the song position one clock tick at a time.

== Pulses per quarter note ==
Pulses per quarter note (PPQN), also known as pulses per quarter (PPQ), and ticks per quarter note (TPQN), is the smallest unit of time used for sequencing note and automation events.

The number of pulses per quarter note is sometimes referred to as the resolution of a MIDI device, and affects the timing of notes that can be achieved by a sequencer. If the resolution is too low (too few PPQN), the performance recorded into the sequencer may sound artificial (being quantized by the pulse rate), losing subtle variations in timing that give the music a human feeling. Purposefully quantized music can have resolutions as low as 24 (the standard for Sync24 and MIDI, which allows triplets and swinging by counting alternate numbers of clock ticks) or even 4 PPQN (which has only one clock pulse per 16th note). 120 PPQN is a common value. At the other end of the spectrum, modern computer-based MIDI sequencers designed to capture more nuance may use 960 PPQN and beyond. This resolution is a measure of time relative to tempo since the tempo defines the length of a quarter note and so the duration of each pulse.

== See also ==
- DIN sync
- Word clock
