= Egyptian Peacekeeping Forces =

- قوات حفظ السلام المصرية
- Active: 1960–
- Country: Egypt
- Type: Land forces
- Role: peacekeeping
- Part of: Egyptian Armed Forces
- Garrison/HQ: Cairo, Egypt
- Nickname: Egyptian Blue Helmets

Commanders
- Current commander: Mohamed Zaki

Due to the capabilities of the Egyptian Army, its battalions are often selected to participate abroad in to establish stability and peace in tense spots in the world, within the peacekeeping forces. 1,654 (1548 males and 106 females) individuals (April 2024) currently participate in international missions deployed in several regions and countries in Africa. Egypt is a major troop- and police-contributing country to UN peacekeeping missions: It is the 7th largest contributor overall, the 3rd largest contributor of police, and the 3rd largest contributor of military experts. Egypt is also a major contributor to doctrinal and policy development through its role as the Rapporteur of the Special Committee on Peacekeeping Operations (C34), and more recently as a member of the UN Security Council (2016–2017). In Africa, Egypt is a major contributor to the African Peace and Security Architecture (APSA), including the African Standby Force (ASF) and the African Capacity for Immediate Response to Crises (ACIRC). It is also a member of the AU Peace and Security Council.

In order to support peacekeeping efforts on the African continent, Egypt established the Cairo International Center for Conflict Resolution, Peacekeeping and Peacebuilding in Africa in 1994 to train about 200 students annually from French, English, and Portuguese-speaking African countries with the aim of enhancing cooperation and interaction between linguistic and cultural groups in Africa. The Center cooperates closely with the African Union Conflict Prevention Mechanism and also with a number of peacekeeping institutions, including the Pearson Center for Peacekeeping.

CCCPA's workshops and trainings cover a wide spectrum of peacekeeping issues, with a particular focus on: Pre-Deployment Trainings (PDT), Senior Mission Leaders Training (SML), Disarmament, Demobilization and Reintegration, Protection of Civilians (PoC), Police Performance and Preventing Sexual Exploitation and Abuse (PSEA).

== History ==
Egypt is among key supporters of the UN Secretary-General's Action for Peace (A4P) initiative aimed at reforming peacekeeping and making the operations more effective. In November 2018, Egypt held a high-level international conference with the aim of improving the impact and performance of UN Peacekeeping operations. The first of its kind since the A4P launch, the conference resulted in the “Cairo Roadmap for Peacekeeping Operations” outlining a workplan as well as a balanced executive framework for shared commitments in relation to the UN Secretary-General's initiative, and it was eventually adopted by the African Union in 2020.

Egypt has a long-standing belief in the vital role of UN Peacekeeping in upholding international peace and security. Egypt's contributions have increased incrementally over time, making it one of the major peacekeeping contributors of military and police personnel. Since 1960, Egypt has contributed more than 30,000 of uniformed peacekeepers who served in 38 UN operations deployed in 24 countries across Africa, Asia, Latin America and Europe. Furthermore, Egypt has been playing a key role and providing valuable contributions when it comes to developing conceptual aspects of peacekeeping and peacebuilding.

In 1960, Egypt began its involvement in United Nations (UN) peacekeeping operations with two paratrooper companies deployed to the UN Operation in the Republic of the Congo. In 2020, it was one of the top troop- and police-contributing countries with more than 3,000 men and women peacekeepers deployed in 7 operations in Africa. Egypt is also a critical player in shaping peacekeeping doctrinal and policy debates.

From the early dates, Egypt was both a host and a contributor of the earliest generations of UN peacekeeping operations: the UN emergency deployment in 1948, in connection with the 1948 war (the Palestine war), and the Congo ONUC operation later on in the 1960s. So, historically for Egypt, UN peacekeepers were considered as enablers of the right to self-determination, and also as enablers to the transition from colonialism to the new wave of independence. This was the primary goal that defined Egypt's foreign policy at that time (in the 1950s and 60s primarily), and its global commitment to the new world that was taking shape then. Later on, UN peacekeepers were considered as enablers of political settlements between and among states: newly independent and fighting around resources, or border disputes inherited from imperial periods. UN peacekeepers were deployed to enable the new generation of states to settle their differences, to draw their borders and to agree on a way to live together peacefully. This was also a very important function of UN peacekeeping in its earlier versions. Much later, in a different version, UN peacekeepers were considered as enablers of political solutions and political settlements within the states—in the context of intrastate conflicts. Especially, in the kinds of conflicts that emerged in the post-cold war era (in the early 1990s until the early 2000s).

The first Egyptian female Police Officer to serve with the UN Peacekeeping Forces was Brigadier Nahed al-Wahy. Al-Wahy graduated from the Police Academy in 1988 and worked for the Passport and Immigration Affairs Authority for 25 years, after which she worked for the unit to combat violence against women. She joined the U.N. Mission in 2014 when the Egyptian Police opened the doors for policewomen to join the Egyptian Peacekeepers.

She served in the headquarters of MINURSO (the United Nations Mission for the Referendum in Western Sahara) where she headed the Egyptian police office. Her main tasks included protecting local women from sexual violence and providing assistance to the survivors of sexual violence, in compliance with United Nations standard for their missions in troubled areas.

Colonel Sahar Ibrahim Abdel Raouf served in the first Egyptian female unit that joined the UN Peacekeeping Forces in Darfur in 2016. Colonel Abdel Rauf graduated from the Police Academy in 1990 and advanced in her positions in the ministry of interior. She attended multiple training courses and special conventions on the settling of disputes and peacekeeping in Africa.

On August 5, 2017, the United Nations Department of Peacekeeping Operations announced that Egypt ranked third in the world within the classification of major countries contributing police forces during the current period, as the number of participating forces reached 729 officers and police personnel within the United Nations peacekeeping forces in a number countries.

The 6th largest contributor of uniformed personnel to UN Peacekeeping, Egypt deployed more than 2,800 military and police personnel to the UN peace operations in Abyei, the Central African Republic, the Democratic Republic of the Congo, Mali, South Sudan, and the Western Sahara in 2023.

“Egypt supports peacekeeping in the most direct way and in so doing it walks the talk. As per the end of April, Egypt was contributing more than 2,800 men and women peacekeepers in the line of duty. These brave women and men serve in some of the most challenging situations on this globe. And some of them pay the highest price, giving their life in the pursuit of peace,” said the United Nations Resident Coordinator in Egypt, Elena Panova during the 75th Anniversary of Peacekeeping celebrated in Egypt. “Indeed, today we remember the Egyptian Blue Helmets that made the ultimate sacrifice in service of humanity.”

The celebration recognized injured Egyptian peacekeepers for their dedication and selflessness and paid tribute to their fallen colleagues who made the ultimate sacrifice in pursuit of peace, while serving under the UN flag. 10 families of injured and fallen Egyptian peacekeepers received honorary certificates from the Ministry of Foreign Affairs and the UN in Egypt.

Over 460 United Nations peacekeepers from the Egyptian combat battalion at the city of Gao, in northern Mali, on Friday departed after the UN announced a complete withdrawal of the mission from Mali by 31 December 2023.

The UN mission said the Egyptian troops “have conducted over a year convoy escorts from Gao to Tessalit, passing through Kidal and Aguelhok, in very challenging conditions marked by the increased use of improvised explosive devices by armed terrorist groups.”

Their various missions, conducted at a steady pace, have contributed to securing logistical convoys and protecting civilians.

Additionally, the Egyptian blue helmets engaged in numerous civil-military activities, such as providing food, school supplies, thousands of other items, and free medical consultations to help the most vulnerable, noted the statement.

The United Nations Multidimensional Integrated Stabilization Mission in Mali (MINUSMA) was established in April 2013 to support the transitional authorities of Mali in the stabilization of the country.

=== Examples of Egyptian participation in peacekeeping forces ===
- Congo — in 1960.
- Sarajevo — during the civil war in the 1990s.
- Ivory Coast — to help the Ivorian parties implement the peace agreement signed between them in January 2003, and end the civil war.
- Congo — during the civil war period from 1960 to 1961, there were 2 parachute companies with a size of 258 individuals.
- Somalia — one mechanized infantry battalion with a size of 240 individuals in the period from December 1992 to May 1993. The size of the participating forces subsequently increased in the period from May 1993 to February 1995 to 1,680 individuals, consisting of a brigade command and 3 mechanized infantry battalions entrusted with protecting Mogadishu Airport and training Somali police personnel.
- Central Africa — from June 1998 until March 2000, there was a mechanized infantry company of 125 individuals, an administrative unit, and a medical unit of 294 individuals within the United Nations peacekeeping mission.
- Angola — there were 28 military observers at various intervals during the period from 1991 to 1999.
- Mozambique — from February 1993 to June 1995.
- Liberia — from December 1993 to September 1997.
- Rwanda — with 10 military observers.
- Comoros — from 1997 to 1999.
- Western Sahara — with 19 military observers from September 1991 until now.
- Sierra Leone — from September 1998.
- Democratic Republic of the Congo — from November 1999.
- Liberia — from December 2003.
- Burundi — from September 2004.
- Darfur region of Sudan — since August 2004.

== Egypt and the UN ==
=== Egypt proposes a UN resolution to prevent sexual exploitation in UN peacekeeping operations ===
On an Egyptian initiative, the United Nations General Assembly unanimously adopted, on September 13, 2018, an Egyptian resolution entitled “Sexual Exploitation and Abuse: Implementing a Zero Tolerance Policy,” which aims primarily to avoid and prevent sexual exploitation in United Nations peacekeeping operations, as the resolution affirms the commitment with a zero-tolerance policy against sexual exploitation and abuse in all organizations of the United Nations system, including agencies, funds and programmes.

The Egyptian President's joining of the “Circle of Leaders” initiative in 2017, and his participation in the meeting held at the United Nations on avoiding and preventing sexual exploitation in United Nations peacekeeping operations, reflects Egypt's interest in combating these crimes, and the consistency of these trends with Egypt's national orientations, especially with Egypt's role. A pioneer in the field of peacekeeping over the past decades, as it is one of the major countries contributing military and police forces to peacekeeping operations around the world, especially on the African continent.

=== Egypt is re-elected as Rapporteur of the United Nations Special Committee for Peacekeeping Operations ===
On February 15, 2021, the United Nations Special Committee for Peacekeeping Operations opened the work of its 2021 session, where the meeting witnessed Egypt's re-election as rapporteur for the committee's work, and Ambassador Mohamed Idris, Egypt's permanent representative to the United Nations, stated that Egypt's re-election as rapporteur for the committee reflects Egypt's active role in Peacekeeping, whether in terms of the size of its military and police contributions, which places it in seventh place among the largest troop-contributing countries, or in terms of its effective contribution to developing peacekeeping concepts and policies.

In Egypt's statement before the committee, Ambassador Idris stressed the importance of the noble role of peacekeepers, praising their precious sacrifices to bring peace to the turbulent world. He also paid tribute to the pure souls of peacekeeping martyrs, stressing that their memory will remain present in hearts and minds. Ambassador Idris noted the repercussions of the COVID-19 pandemic, which affected peacekeeping operations and doubled the difficulties and complexities of peacekeeping environments. He appreciated the efforts of the United Nations that contributed to reducing the spread of infections in the field and the effective response to infected cases.

He stressed the importance of the ongoing consultations on vaccinating peacekeepers against the Corona virus, noting the need to ensure rapid, fair and equitable access to the vaccine for the benefit of all peacekeepers without discrimination. Ambassador Idris also presented the Egyptian priorities, which included enhancing the security and safety of peacekeepers, enhancing the interconnection and integration between peacekeeping and peacebuilding, especially within the framework of Egypt's current presidency of the United Nations Peacebuilding Commission, and supporting the comprehensive approach to developing the performance of peacekeeping operations in accordance with the vision included in the “Cairo Road Map.” Emphasizing the priority of political solutions to conflicts and the need for peacekeeping operations to adopt clear and time-bound political strategies, increasing women's participation in peacekeeping, and deepening the partnership between the United Nations and the African Union in peacekeeping.

=== International praise for Egypt's role in peacekeeping forces ===
In May 2021, the United Nations celebrated the names of five Egyptian peacekeepers who served with the United Nations Multidimensional Integrated Stabilization Mission in Mali (MINUSMA). The United Nations Resident Coordinator in Egypt, Elena Panova, also praised the role played by Cairo as one of the largest contributors to UN peacekeeping operations. Panova said: “Egypt has always been an essential partner on the path to lasting peace... and we, in the United Nations system in Egypt, salute the courage, service and sacrifice of Egyptian peacekeepers in order to protect the vulnerable and help build peace,” according to what was published by the United Nations Media Center in Cairo.

In July 2019, the United Nations praised Egyptian participation in the peacekeeping forces, as the United Nations Police noted, through its official Twitter account, that Egypt remains among the top 3 contributors to police forces within the peacekeeping forces. The praise came on the sidelines of the United Nations Police Selection and Appointment Department holding meetings in the Egyptian Ministries of Foreign Affairs and Interior, following the Director of the Cairo Center for Conflict Resolution and Peacekeeping holding training courses in cooperation with the United Nations, to support and consolidate security and peace on the African continent, coinciding with the Egyptian presidency. of the African Union, where Egypt places security issues on the continent as its top priority.

In May 2016, the Central Security Sector received international and local praise for the high-level security performance of the Egyptian police units participating in the United Nations peacekeeping operations in the Democratic Republic of the Congo, and the efficiency and professionalism of the forces in performing their security tasks to maintain security and confront all forms of crime.

This praise comes in the wake of the arrival of an additional unit of the Egyptian police (Central Security Forces) to the Democratic Republic of the Congo, to participate with the United Nations mission in many of the security missions entrusted with securing the capital.

=== The United Nations honors Egypt among the countries that contribute most to maintaining international peace and security ===
May 26, 2023 In the framework of the annual celebration organized by the United Nations in New York to commemorate the role of peacekeepers, coinciding with the 75th anniversary of UN peacekeeping operations, Egypt was honored for its essential role and for its appreciated contribution to peacekeeping forces in the major missions of the United Nations. The celebration and medal included Which Egypt received to provide an opportunity to renew Egypt's commitment to continue giving and contributing to the United Nations peacekeeping system, as an extension of the noble sacrifices made by the Egyptian military and police forces as they performed their honorable duty to establish international peace and security over the past decades.
