= African Governance Architecture =

Organization

- Abbreviation: AGA
- Formation: 2011
- Purpose: Promote Good Governance in Africa
- Headquarters: Addis Ababa, Ethiopia
- Region served: Africa
- Official language: Arabic, English, French and Portuguese
- Parent organization: African Union
- Website: www.aga-platform.org

The African Governance Architecture (AGA) is a mechanism for dialogue between stakeholders that are mandated to promote good governance and bolster democracy in Africa. In the book entitled The African Union Law (Ed. Berger Levrault, 2014, p. 29) Blaise Tchikaya established the link between conceptual platform called AGA and the modernisation of International Law applicable to African states. The AGA is fundamentally one aspect – probably the most significant – of recent international law of governance. Furthermore, it is a key actor in promoting the domestication and implementation of the objectives outlined in the legal and policy pronouncements in the African Union (AU) Shared Values. Established in 2011 AGA is based in Addis Ababa, Ethiopia in the AU Headquarters with the AGA Platform Members based Africa wide. In February 2016 the rules of Procedure on how the AGA legally functions were adopted by Member States during the African Union Summit.

== History ==
The discussion of a “Pan-african Architecture on Governance” began with the 16th Ordinary Session of the African Assembly which focused on the theme of the Shared Values of the AU. This Session was held in Addis Ababa, Ethiopia, in 2011 and adopted a mandate that would establish a "Pan-African Architecture on Governance". In order to give effect to the Assembly decision on the Establishment of the Pan-African Governance Architecture, the African Union Commission (AUC) established the African Governance Architecture (AGA) as a platform that promotes interactions between stakeholders who work on promoting good governance and strengthening democracy in Africa, in addition to translating the objectives of the legal and policy pronouncements in the AU Shared Values (see below for more information).

With 2012 being the year of AU Shared Values the diverse charters of the AU were pushed to becoming an integral guide to the activities to both the Organs and Member States of the African Union. As a result, the African Charter for Democracy, Elections and Governance (ACDEG), an integral document stipulating the functions of the AGA, was put into force after being adopted in 2007.

On the 14 of June the AGA Platform was established in Lusaka, Zambia in order to create a space within the AGA structure where the diverse stakeholders and organs of the AU working in the field of Democracy, Elections and Governance work together to implement and domesticate the AU Shared Values.

In 2013 both the Platform and Secretariat became operational and finally for the 26th ordinary Session of the AU assembly (Jan 2016) the Rules of Procedure were legally adopted giving the AGA a legal guide on its activities.

== Goals and Purpose/Mandate ==
=== Goal ===
The overall goal of the AGA is to strengthen good governance and consolidate democracy in Africa.

=== Objectives ===
1. Accelerate the ratification, domestication, implementation and monitoring of African Shared values instrument
1. Deepen synergy, coordination, cooperation and harmonization of shared values instruments among AU organs, institutions and RECs on democracy, governance, human rights and humanitarian affairs.
1. Enhance the capacity of AU organs, institutions and RECs to support Member States to strengthen governance and consolidate democracy through implementation of shared values agenda
1. Enhance popular participation and citizen engagement in attainment of democracy, governance and respect for human and peoples’ rights
1. Coordinate evaluation and reporting on implementation and compliance with AU norms on governance and democracy as envisaged by article 44, 45 and 49 of the ACDEG.
1. Foster dialogue and share comparable lessons on trends, challenges, opportunities and prospects for improving governance and democracy among Member States
1. Generate, manage and disseminate knowledge on African shared values agenda, good governance and democracy in Africa.
1. Facilitate joint engagement and deepen synergy with the African Peace and Security Architecture (APSA) in strategic interventions: preventive diplomacy, conflict prevention and post-conflict, reconstruction and development in Africa.

== AGA Structure ==
Four interrelated components make up the structure of AGA:

=== Norms & Standards ===
The AGA is structured around a normative framework that is set up by the African Union Shared Values. AGA is based on objectives and principles that have been defined in the various AU Shared Values instruments that AU Member States have signed and ratified and thus committed to, including but not limited to the following:

Name of instrument	Short description
Constitutive Act of the African Union	Establishes the African Union and defines its objectives, in particular a commitment to promote democratic principles and institutions, popular participation and good governance.
African Charter on Democracy, Elections and Governance	Expands upon the constitutive act, committing Member States to the adherence of universal values and principles of democracy and respect for human rights. It promotes the adherence to rule of law, the holding of free and fair elections, and the rejection of unconstitutional changes of government.
African Charter on Human and Peoples' Rights	Recognizes the rights, duties and freedoms that accrue to all Africans and commits Member States to undertake to adopt legislative or other measures to give effect to those rights.
OAU Convention Governing the Specific Aspects of Refugee Problems in Africa	Defines the term “refugee” and ensures that those seeking asylum shall be protected.
African Charter on the Rights and Welfare of the Child	Recognizes the freedom from discrimination, inherent rights, and the necessity of protecting children under the law on the continent.
Protocol to the African Charter establishing the African Court on Human and Peoples’ Rights	Provides for the functions, responsibilities and jurisdiction of the Court, along with the process for submitting to the Court.
Protocol to the African Charter on Human and Peoples' Rights on the Rights of Women in Africa	Requires State Parties to combat all forms of discrimination against women through appropriate legislative, institutional and other measures. It also commits State Parties to modify the social and cultural patterns of conduct of women and men to achieving the elimination of harmful cultural and traditional practices and all other practices which are based on the idea of the inferiority or the superiority of either of the sexes, or on stereotyped roles for women and men.
African Charter on Values and Principles of Public Service and Administration	Aims to ensure quality and innovative service delivery that meets the requirements of all users while encouraging the efforts of Member States in modernizing administration and strengthening capacity for the improvement of public service.
African Union Convention for the Protection and Assistance of Internally Displaced Persons in Africa	Establishes a legal framework for preventing internal displacement, and protecting and assisting internally displaced persons in Africa, while providing for durable solutions to displacement.
Protocol on the Statute of the African Court of Justice & Human Rights	Aims at merging the African Court on Human and Peoples' Rights and the Court of Justice of the African Union. It specifically establishes the Court and defines its organization, jurisdiction and procedures.
Protocol Relating to the Establishment of the Peace and Security Council of the African Union	Establishes a standing decision-making organ for the prevention, management and resolution of conflicts on the continent.
African Union Convention on Preventing and Combating Corruption	Acknowledges the damaging effects of corruption on the continent and promotes the development of mechanisms required to prevent, detect, punish and eradicate corruption and related offenses in the public and private sectors.
African Youth Charter	Protects young people from discrimination and ensures freedom of movement, speech, association, religion, ownership of property and other human rights, while committing to promoting youth participation throughout society.
Algiers Declaration on Unconstitutional Changes	Addresses the importance of strengthening the capacity of the AU to deal with the scourge of unconstitutional changes of government.
Lomé Declaration on Unconstitutional Changes of Government	Affirms and updates the Algiers Declaration, committing to the AU's rejection of unconstitutional changes in government.
OAU/AU Declaration on Principles Governing Democratic Elections	Provides for democratic elections as a basis of the authority of any representative government and states the principles for such elections, including guidance for observers and monitors.
Conference on Stability, Security, Development and Democracy (CSSDCA) Memorandum of Understanding	Reaffirms the fundamental link between stability, human security, development and cooperation in a manner that reinforces each other.
African Union Post-Conflict and Reconstruction Policy Framework	Sets out an African agenda for post-conflict reconstruction which aims to, among other things, address the nexus between the peace, security, humanitarian and development dimensions of post-conflict reconstruction and peacebuilding.
New Partnership for Africa's Development (NEPAD) Declaration on Democracy, Political, Economic & Corporate Governance	Commits to ensuring that Heads of States’ respective national constitutions reflect the democratic ethos and commits support to democracy and good political governance, economic and corporate governance, socioeconomic development and the African Peer Review Mechanism.
Memorandum of Understanding on the African Peer Review Mechanism (APRM)	Establishes partnerships with the States who have signed on to APRM and commits to implementing the shared commitments as established in the Constitutive Act.
Kigali Declaration on Human Rights in Africa	Reaffirms the principle that all human rights are universal, indivisible, inter-dependent and inter-related. It reaffirms Member States commitments to upholding and protecting these rights as noted.
Solemn Declaration on Gender Equality in Africa	Reaffirms the commitment to gender equality and agrees to accelerate the implementation of measures to combat discrimination and ensure the full and effective participation of women in peace processes.
Declaration on the Theme of the 2012 Summit “Towards Greater Unity and Integration through Shared Values”	Establishes AGA and commits the African Union towards implementing and affirming its Shared Values.

=== AGA Platform ===
The AGA Platform consists of institutions and AU Organs with a formal mandate on governance, democracy, human rights, elections and humanitarian assistance. The Platform envisions to harmonize the shared instruments and coordinate joint initiatives in governance and democracy. The members are:

AGA Platform members	Short description
AU Peace and Security Council	AU PSC has the mandate to foster peace, stability and security it is ultimately the decision-making organ for the prevention, management and resolution of conflicts in Africa.
African Union Commission	AUC acts as the Union's Secretariat and thus in charge of executive functions, which entail driving the African integration and development process with continuous cooperation with the African Union Member States, the Regional Economic Communities and African citizens.
Regional Economic Communities (RECs)	The RECS have a mandate to facilitate regional cooperation and provide support in security, economic and development matters. AMU/UMA, CEN-SAD, COMESA, EAC, CEEAC-ECCAS, CEDEAO-ECOWAS, IGAD and SADC are considered to be the building blocks of the African Economic Community.
African Commission on Human and Peoples’ Rights (ACHPR)	The ACHPR is specifically mandated under the provisions of the African Charter on Human and Peoples’ Rights to protect and promote human and peoples’ rights on the continent especially on request by a state party, organs of the AU or individuals. The ACHPR has adopted various resolutions to complement the Charter.
African Union Commission on International Law (AUCIL)	AUCIL aims at the "codification and progressive development of international law in the African Continent".
Pan-African Parliament (PAP)	The PAP was set up to establish a common platform and to secure the development and economic integration of the continent with the full participation of Africa's People. The Goal is to develop into an institution that sports full legislative powers and whose members are elected by universal adult suffrage.
African Peer Review Mechanism (APRM)	The APRM is a voluntary self-assessment mechanism, voluntary setup through a memorandum of understanding signed by African Heads of State. The APRM was designed to promote more effective governance across four thematic areas: Democracy and Political Governance, Corporate Governance, Economic Governance and Management, and Socioeconomic Development.
Economic, Social and Cultural Council (ECOSOCC)	ECOSOCC is a mechanism designed to set up a cooperative relationship with African Civil Society and strengthen the interaction with Civil Society Organizations especially in decision making processes.
AU Advisory Board on Corruption (AUABC)	The AUABC has a mandate to Encourage Member States to monitor, prevent, punish and eradicate corruption by setting up new laws, legislation and regulations that State Parties and political officials are obliged to follow. It not only sets up methodologies on how to fight corruption but also disseminates information on corruption and its negative impacts. It works under the mandate of the African Union Convention on Preventing and Combating Corruption (AUCPCC) m.
African Committee of Experts on the Rights and Welfare of the Child (ACERWC)	ACERWC aims at protecting and promoting the rights enshrined in the African Charter on the Rights and Welfare of the Child, particularly to document information and encourage relevant national and local institutions to undertake initiatives towards this cause, while making recommendations to Member States. The Committee formulates and lays down principles and rules aimed at protecting the rights and welfare of children in Africa.
New Partnership for Africa's Development (NEPAD)-Planning and Coordination Agency	The NEPAD is the technical body of the African Union, working on economic development. its Three foci are on establishing a basis for sustainable development (spearheaded by good governance, peace and security), identifying priority fields where activities should be implemented and sourcing funding to make these projects a reality. The projects are both regional and continental in nature.
African Court on Human and Peoples’ Rights (AfCHPR)	The AfCHPR was founded to reinforce the human rights protection system in Africa with a strong focus on ensuring compliance with the African Charter on Human and Peoples’ Rights, through judicial decisions.

=== The Clusters and Secretariat ===
The AGA Platform is technically assisted by the AGA Secretariat and the Clusters within AGA. They are both the mechanisms for interaction and foster the engagement of the AGA Platform Members.

==== Clusters ====
The Clusters were established as coordinating arms to support and achieve the goals of AGA. There are five clusters focusing on the different fields that AGA is involved in. These are:

Cluster	Focus Areas	Short Description
Democracy	i. Elections ii. Parliaments iii. Political Parties	The Cluster monitors the implementation of democratic electoral processes and standards in Member States as well as monitor, review and assess the state of democracy in Africa.
Human Rights and Transitional Justice	i. Norms and Standards ii. Redress Mechanisms	The Cluster seeks to ensure effective promotion and protection of human and peoples’ rights on the continent as well as coordinate efforts to develop the Transitional Justice Policy Framework for Africa.
Humanitarian affairs	i. Free Movement of Peoples ii. Refugees iii. Protection of Civilians	The Cluster seeks to ensure that the root causes of forced displacement are addressed and develop an appropriate continental guideline to facilitate inter-regional movement of persons. It also aims to find durable solutions to the challenges relating to refugees, returnees and internally displaced persons (IPDs) in Africa. The cluster engages with relevant actors to develop coordinated and appropriate preparedness and responses to disasters and humanitarian crisis on the continent.
Constitutionalism and Rule of law	i. Rejecting Unconstitutional Changes of Government ii. Executive, Legislative and Judicial Systems	The Cluster seeks to promote and enhance adherence to the principle of the rule of law and enhance constitutional order in Africa, including addressing unconstitutional changes in government. The cluster also seeks to support AU Member States constitutional and institutional reforms and rebuilding especially those emerging from conflict.
Governance	i. Public service and administration ii. Local governance and decentralization iii. Anti-corruption and accountability	The Cluster seeks to promote the strengthening of institutions of public service delivery including decentralization and accountability.

==== Secretariat ====
Source: The AGA Secretariat as mentioned is the coordinating hub of the AGA Platform. It is housed in the Department of Political Affairs of the African Union Commission (AUC) and is responsible for collating and processing the Platform outcomes for presentation to, and consideration by AU Policy Organs.

=== African Governance Facility ===
The African Governance Facility (APF) is the resource mobilization framework of AGA designed to support Platform Members’ initiatives and programs which promote good governance and democracy on the continent. The facility aims to especially promote: "institutional capacity strengthening and building; dialogues to facilitate citizen engagement in democratic governance processes; technical support to Member States towards the ratification, domestication, implementation and reporting on AU Shared Values instruments; and preventive diplomacy, post conflict reconstruction and peacebuilding initiatives".

== Activities ==
The activities are divided between the activities of the AGA secretariat that are meant to coordinate the implementation and activities of the AGA platform members and secondly the activities of the AGA platform members.

The AGA Secretariat activities are as follows:

=== Youth Engagement Strategy ===
The AGA Youth Engagement Strategy was set up to promote the effective participation of Africa's youths in democratic governance initiatives of the AGA platform especially with a focus on democracy, elections, human rights and governance in Africa. With Africa having the youngest population on earth the Youth Strategy thus sees this as an area of focus for increasing the engagement with civil society.

The Strategy especially suggests to develop a continental youth mentorship program, setup Model AUs working closely with higher learning institutions in Africa and making space for AU "youth ambassador" positions.

=== High level Dialogue ===
This Dialogue occurred for the fourth time in December 2015. It was set up to create an annual event where AGA Platform members, member states and non-state actors frankly account and analyze the impact of their work towards consolidating democracy and bolstering good governance in Africa. In order to further align with the previously mentioned Youth Engagement Strategy, AGA has also introduced a youth pre-forum that aims to bolster the involvement of youths in High Level meetings. The topics of the last four High Level Dialogues were:

1. November 2012 in Dakar, Senegal, on the state of democratic governance in Africa
2. November, 2013 in Dakar, Senegal, and focused on enhancing constitutionalism and rule of law in Africa
3. October 2014 in Dakar, Senegal, on the theme silencing the guns: strengthening governance in resolving conflicts in Africa.
4. December 2015 in Kigali, Rwanda reviewed and addressed the state of women's equal participation and leadership in political parties in Africa (with a Youth Pre-forum).

=== Knowledge Management Strategy ===
Currently the AGA is working on a unified Knowledge Management Strategy that envisions to create a unified strategy to compile, produce and disseminate knowledge products on the Platform members. The exact content of the strategy is yet to be announced and verified by external sources.

Furthermore, the Platform Members work actively in ensuring joint programming a few examples are:

The African Commission working together with the African Court and the African Charter on the Rights and Welfare of the Child on a joint inquiry mission in South Sudan resulting in a 315-page document highlighting the Human Rights violations on the basis on which extensive recommendations were set forward.

State Reporting guidelines as legislated in the ACDEG and finalized with the adoption of the rules of procedure obligate countries to submit a State Report every 2 years. To date none have been submitted. The State Reporting Process and Mechanism gives rise to large scale interaction between all AGA Platform Members especially as members such as the Commission or APRM have existing State reporting mechanisms that can be utilized and thus create synergies within the mandate of AGA.

== AGA Synergies ==
Due to the nature of the AGA there are many overlapping areas with other organs and structures within the African Union. As it is a coordinating body much like the African Peace and Security Architecture (APSA) they complement each other in that they both acknowledge that democratic governance and Peace and Security are interrelated and are reinforcing factors required to achieve both. Thus AGA and APSA are working on mutually reinforcing projects through structure such as the Inter- Departmental Task Force on Conflict Prevention (IDTFCP)

Critics have noted that this looks good on paper but little has become operational within this synergy. The weak linkages need to be strengthened to become mutually beneficial

== Achievements ==
- joint Election Observation Missions between AGA Platform Members
- Adopted Rules of Procedure that legally define the mandate of AGA.
- The Launch of Project 2016- "African Year of Human Rights with a particular focus on the Rights of Women"
- 4 High Level Dialogues that resulted in further consolidation between AGA Platform Members, Civil Society Organizations, Member States and Youths.

== Challenges and criticism ==
The main challenges that have been identified by various think tanks and external Evaluations are:

1. "The AGA and APSA do not yet have strong institutional connections"
2. "The Constitutive Act of the AU only makes reference to ‘good governance’ and not ‘governance’. The conspicuous absence of the fundamental concept of good governance, which is entrenched in the Constitutive Act, will render the AGA ineffective since ‘governance’ as a concept does not necessarily advance the objective of the AU of promoting good governance."
3. The AU Commission, which is the heart of AGA lacks clear organizational structures and thus is not ideal to spearhead the initiative.
4. AGA needs to establish a sustainable funding scheme that will ensure independent and well functioning structures.
5. The collaborative work between AGA and its Platform Members are still unclear especially with actors such as APRM.

== See also ==
- Pan African Parliament
- African Commission on Human and Peoples' Rights
- African Court on Human and Peoples' Rights
- African Peer Review Mechanism
- African Charter on Human and Peoples' Rights
- ECOSOCC
- NEPAD
- RECs
- ACERWC
- African Union Commission
- African Union
