= PSC =

PSC may refer to:

== Business ==
- People with Significant Control, in United Kingdom company law
- Personal service corporation, in United States tax law
- Protein Sciences Corporation, an American biotech company
- Public Service Commission (disambiguation), regulatory bodies, with competence varying by jurisdiction
- Production sharing contract, a type of contract used in the resource extraction industry

== Government ==
- Public Safety Canada
- Pacific Salmon Commission
- Public Service of Canada

== Education ==
- Parkwood Secondary College, Ringwood North, Victoria, Australia
- Parkdale Secondary College, Mordialloc, Victoria, Australia
- Peter Symonds College, Winchester, UK
- Pensacola State College, Pensacola, Florida
- Peru State College, Peru, Nebraska
- Photography Studies College, Melbourne, Victoria, Australia
- Polk State College, Polk County, Florida
- Putonghua Proficiency Test (pinyin: Pǔtōnghuà Shuǐpíng Cèshì), Mandarin proficiency test in Mainland China

== Military ==
- psc (military), "Principal Staff Course" (British Army, and Air Force), or "Passed Staff Course" (Royal Navy)
- Polar Security Cutter program, a new ship class under deve for the United States Coast Guard
- Private security contractor

== Places ==
- Palm Springs, California, USA
- Pointe-Saint-Charles, Montreal, Quebec, Canada

== Politics ==
- Centre démocrate humaniste, formerly known as the Christian Social Party (PSC)
- Christian Social Party (Belgium, defunct), a former Belgian party, now called Les Engagés
- Christian Social Party (Belgium), a political party in the German-speaking community of Belgium
- Palestine Solidarity Campaign, in the United Kingdom
- Partido Social Conservador, a political party in Nicaragua
- Partido Social Cristiano (disambiguation), name of two political parties, one in Ecuador and the other in Nicaragua
- Partido Socialista de Chile, a Chilean party
- Partit dels Socialistes de Catalunya, or Socialists' Party of Catalonia, a Catalan party
- Peace and Security Council, of the African Union
- Political and Security Committee, a permanent body of the European Union
- Social Christian Party (Brazil) (Partido Social Cristão), a party in Brazil
- Politburo Standing Committee of the Chinese Communist Party
- Proportionality for Solid Coalitions, a criterion for ranked PR methods

== Science and medicine ==
- Pacific Science Center, a science museum in Seattle, Washington
- Pancreatic stellate cell
- Pediatric Symptom Checklist, a psychological assessment tool
- Phylogenetic species concept
- Pisces (constellation), a zodialcal constellation
- Pluripotent stem cell
- Polar stratospheric cloud
- Posterior subcapsular cataract
- Postsynaptic current
- Premature stop codon, a type of DNA mutation
- Primary sclerosing cholangitis, a liver disease

== Sports ==
- Partille Sport Club, Swedish field- and indoor hockey team
- Philippine Sports Commission
- Porsche Supercup, one-make production GT3-based stock car racing series
- Professional soccer club

== Technology ==
- Palestinian Satellite Channel, TV channel
- Permanent split capacitor, a type of AC motor
- Perovskite solar cell
- Personal supercomputer, a high-performance computer system
- Peirce Smith converter, a type of furnance common in the extractive metallurgy of non-ferrous metals
- Pittsburgh Supercomputing Center, National Science Foundation funded Supercomputer center
- PlayStation Classic, a game console by Sony
- Polymer solar cell
- Portable Single Crew (also Portable Single Camera), another way of referring to a single-camera setup
- Prestressed concrete
- Printer-Scanner-Copier, a term by Hewlett-Packard

== Transport ==
- Pan-Atlantic Steamship Company
- Port State Control
- Prescot railway station, England; National Rail station code PSC
- Tri-Cities Airport (Washington), Pasco, Washington (IATA and FAA LID code : PSC)

== Other ==
- PSC (musical group) or Pimp $quad Click, an American hip hop group
- Power supply cabinet, a box for electric current delivering devices
- President of the Supreme Court (England, Wales and Northern Ireland) - see pertinent subsections under Judge
- PSC, Integrated Science Teacher
