= Eastern Africa Standby Force =

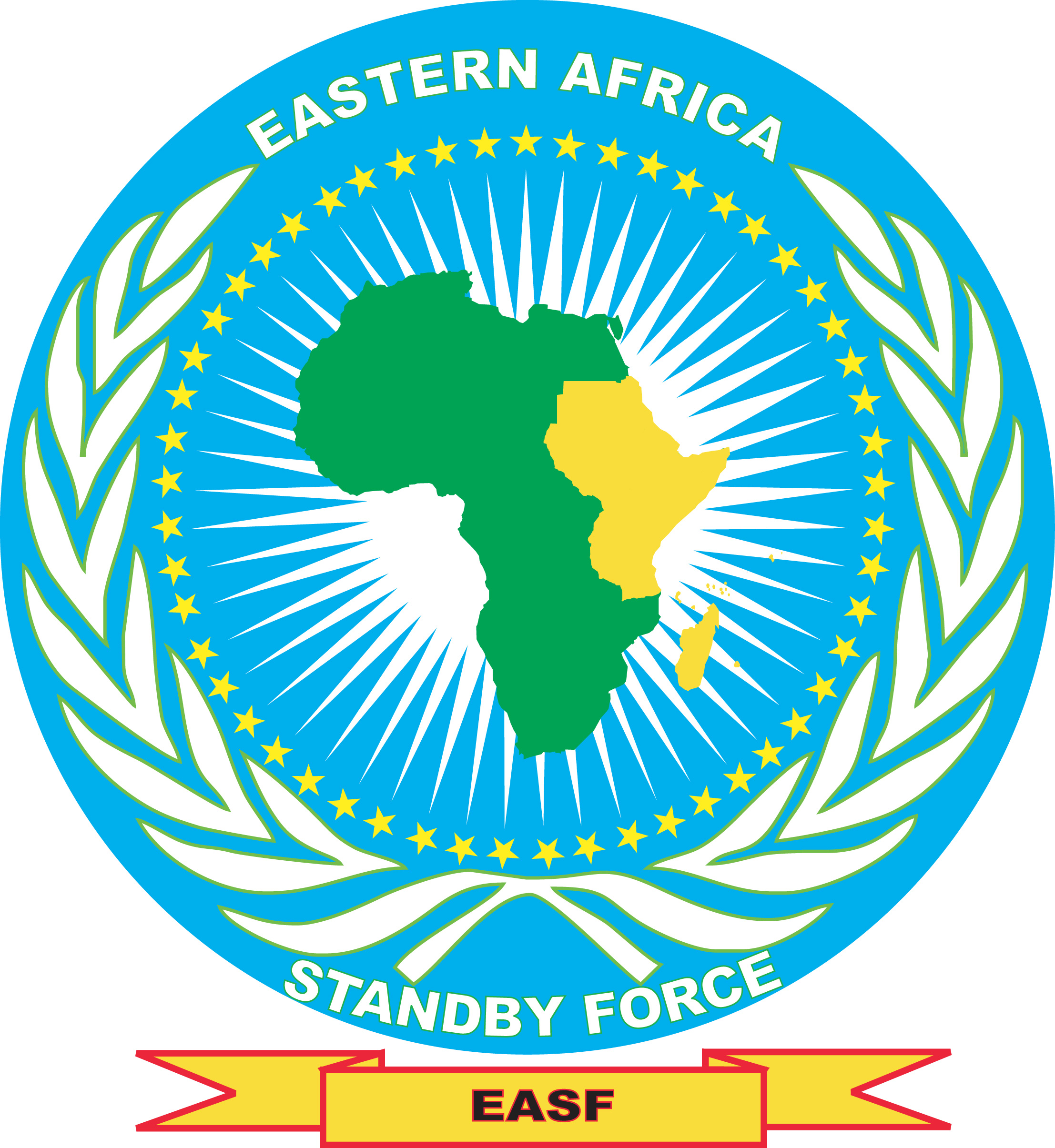
Eastern Africa Standby Force Logo

The Eastern Africa Standby Force (EASF), formerly Eastern Africa Standby Brigade (EASBRIG), is one of the five regional forces for Peace Support Operations (PSOs) of the African Standby Force, consisting of military, police and civilian components. EASF constitutes the regional operational arm of the peacekeeping elements of the African Peace and Security Architecture, put in place by the 2002 Protocol Relating to the Establishment of the Peace and Security Council of the African Union.

As of January 2018, EASF has ten member states: Burundi, Comoros, Djibouti, Ethiopia, Kenya, Rwanda, Seychelles, Somalia, Sudan and Uganda. From April 2013, the Republic of South Sudan had the status of an observer and, according to EASF, was expected to eventually become a full member shortly. In June 2014, Somali Prime Minister Ahmed recommitted Somalia to the force during an African Union Summit in Equatorial Guinea. A follow-up meeting on troop contributions from the EASF member nations was conducted in August 2014.

== Evolution of EASF ==
The predecessor of EASF, EASBRIG, was formed on September 10, 2004 through a Policy Framework between the member states, following the decision of the Summit of the African Union (AU) held in July of the same year in Addis Ababa, Ethiopia. On April 11, 2005, a Memorandum of Understanding (MoU) was signed between EASBRIG member states, which provided for three components : a Planning Element, Brigade Headquarters and Logistics Base. A decision of the Eastern Africa Council of Ministers of Defense and Security of March 30, 2007 directed the change of name of the institution from Brigade to Force (EASF) in line with a continental directive of the AU Council of Ministers of Defense and Security. It further established a Coordination Mechanism (EASFCOM), enlarging the number of EASF components to four. In order to reflect these changes and the multifaceted nature of the Force, a revised MoU and Policy Framework were signed in January 2011.

The Memorandum of Understanding (MoU) laid out the legal framework for EASF. It also outlines the mode of establishment and management of the Force as well as the principles which guide the Force and the other organs of EASF.

=== Mandate ===
Article 13 of the Protocol Relating to the Establishment of the Peace and Security Council of the African Union (AU), signed in 2002, directs EASF to carry out the following functions:

- observation and monitoring missions;
- other types of peace support missions;
- intervention in a Member State in respect of grave circumstances or at the request of a Member State in order to restore peace and security, in accordance with Article 4(h) and (j) of the Constitutive Act;
- preventive deployment in order to prevent

i. a dispute or a conflict from escalating,
ii. an ongoing violent conflict from spreading to neighboring areas or States, and
iii. the resurgence of violence after parties to a conflict have reached an agreement.;

- peace-building, including post-conflict disarmament and demobilization;
- humanitarian assistance to alleviate the suffering of civilian population in conflict areas and support efforts to address major natural disasters; and
- any other functions as may be mandated by the Peace and Security Council or the Assembly.

According to the Protocol, the ASF and EASF are encouraged to cooperate with the United Nations and its Agencies, other relevant international organizations and regional organizations, as well as with national authorities and NGOs, where appropriate. The detailed tasks of the ASF and its modus operandi for each authorized mission are to be considered and approved by the Peace and Security Council upon recommendation of the Commission.

== Organization ==
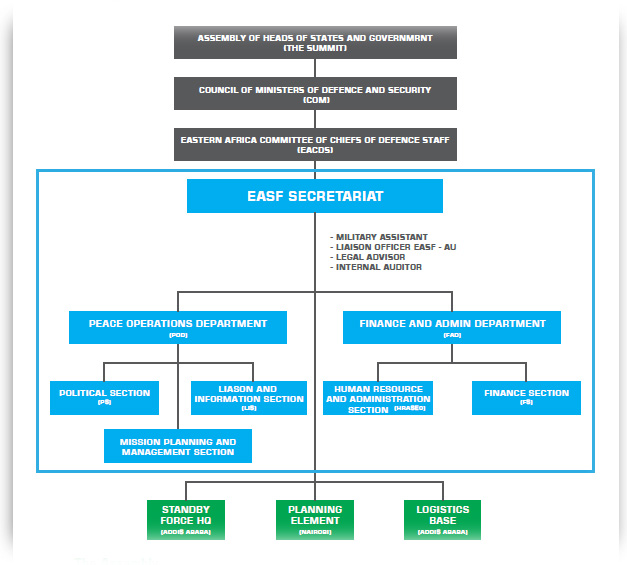
EASF Decision Making Organs and Structures

The MoU provides for three EASF policy-formulating, -controlling and -implementing organs:

The Assembly of Eastern Africa Heads of State and Government

The Assembly has the supreme authority over EASF. The Heads of State and Governments meet at least once a year to formulate policies, direct and control the functioning of EASF. In times of crisis, the assembly authorizes the deployment of the Force.

The Eastern Africa Council of Ministers of Defense and Security

The Council, which congresses at least twice a year, manages all aspects relating to EASF, appoints the Director and Heads of departments of EASFCOM as well as the Commander of EASBRIG.

The Eastern Africa Committee of Chiefs of Defense Staff (EACDS)

The EACDS serves as an advisory Military Committee of the Council and the Assembly. Its functions are to oversee, direct and manage EASFCOM on all technical matters as well as oversee, direct and manage the PLANELM, EASBRIG HQ and Logistic Base.

While other regional ASF forces are implemented by Regional Economic Communities (RECs), namely ECOWAS, SADC, and ECCAS, with respective regional protocols already in place, the EASF is an entirely different regional arrangement, called Regional Mechanism (RM), that co-exists with several economic communities in East Africa that also implement security measures.

Since the 2007 decision of the Eastern Africa Council of Ministers of Defense and Security, EASF is composed of four components: EASFCOM, PLANELM, LOGBASE, and EASBRIG HQ.

=== The EASF Secretariat ===
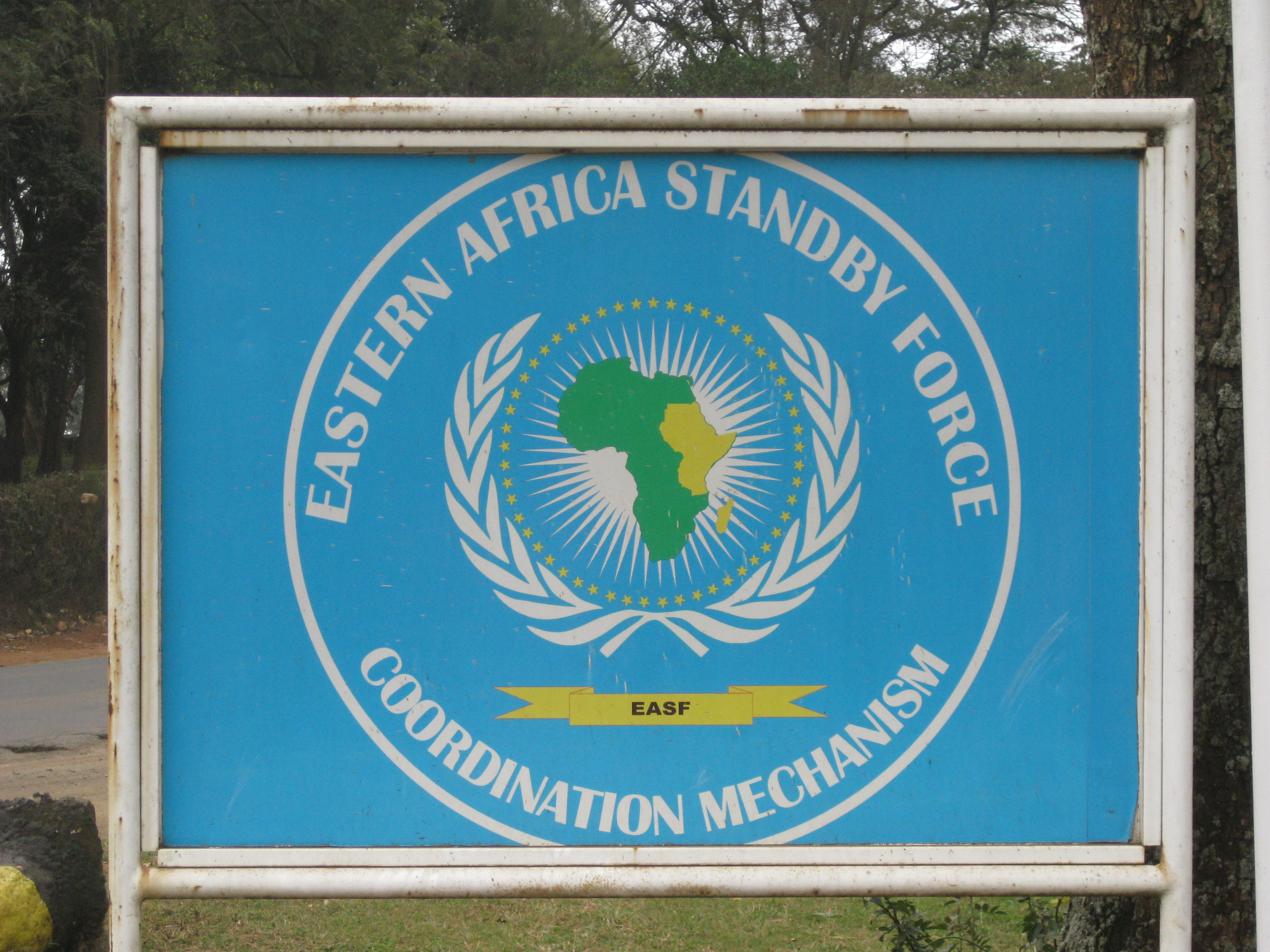
EASF coordination mechanism highway turnoff sign, Westwood Park Road, Nairobi, Kenya

The Eastern Africa Standby Force Secretariat (EASFSEC) serves as the executive secretariat for the organisation. It was established in March 2007 by the decision of the Eastern Africa Council of Ministers of Defense and Security. It is based in Karen, Nairobi, (Kenya), co-located with the Planning Element. It coordinates all EASF activities in consultation with concerned authorities of the Member States and the African Union (AU). It is mandated to implement all EASF policies, develop and reviews EASF policy documents to be approved by the Council of Ministers, and to mobilize financial and other resources in collaboration with the AU, Regional Economic Communities (RECs) and other partners. It also manages the EASF Fund, disseminates information and carries out public relation activities.

EASFSEC is led by a Director and the Heads of Departments (Finance & Administration and Peace Operations Department). These are appointed by the Council of Ministers of Defense and Security. Since April 2017, Dr. Abdillahi Omar Bouh from the Republic of Djibouti is currently serving as the fifth Director of EASF. He was preceded by Amb Chanfi Issimail from the Union of Comoros. Before Amb Chanfi was Mr. Maj-Gen (Rtd) Cyrille Ndayirukiye (Burundi, 3rd), Col Peter Marwa (Kenya, 2nd) and Mr. Simon Mulongo (1st). The management is assisted by a Legal Advisor, Military Advisor, Internal Auditor and an AU Liaison Officer.

=== Planning element ===
The Planning Element (PLANELM) of the Eastern Africa Standby Force is constituted as a "multi-national and multidimensional full-time planning headquarters". It is based in Nairobi, Kenya. PLANELM’s main function is to establish a Force that is capable of planning and preparation for those complex Peace Support Operations (PSOs) provided for in the six ASF mission scenarios. PLANELM is tasked with concept development, training coordination, reconnaissance, mission planning, mounting, deployment, employment & sustainment as well as recovery for/of the Military, Police, and Civilian Component.

PLANELM comprises a military, police and civilian component, with personnel appointed by the EASF Member States. Beside the Heads of Components who are leading their respective component, a Joint Chief of Staff coordinates all three components.

Active since 2004, the Military Component of the PLANELM mainly carries out force preparation and pre-deployment planning of EASF. Head of the component can be either a Chief of Staff, a military officer or Colonel.

The Police Component of the EASF PLANELM, established in 2008, is tasked with the development of a fully functioning Police Component for PSOs that will be carried out in Eastern Africa or other African regions. It is led by someone with a rank of an Assistant Commissioner of Police.

Also established in 2008, the Civilian Component of the PLANELM, undertakes the planning of most civilian functions and procedures in an EASF PSO. Therefore, the Civilian Component is responsible for dealing with all political affairs, planning and coordinating of civilian activities, giving legal advice, informing the public and media, executing electoral management and -observation as well as dealing with all matters of civil affairs, child protection, and protection of civilians. This Component is led by a Civil Servant with the required qualifications and experience.

The personnel for PLANELM is seconded by the Member States for a minimum period of one year.

=== Force Headquarters (EASF Force HQ) ===
The EASF Force Headquarters (EASF Force HQ) functions as the command headquarters for both preparation and operational command of the military arm of the multidimensional force, the "Standby Brigade". It is situated in Addis Ababa, Ethiopia. EASF Force HQ is composed of military and civilian staff seconded by the EASF Member States. In case of deployment, the African Union (AU) or United Nations assume the operational control of the Brigade. EASF Force HQ works in close collaboration with PLANELM to prepare the structure and plans for a mission Headquarters. The deployment of the EASF is either mandated by the Assembly of EASF or the AU. If the AU mandates the deployment, the Peace and Security Council (PSC) of the AU is responsible for the appointment of the commander of the HQ. Each member state seconds officers to the EASF Force HQ for a period of two years.

=== Logistic Base (LOGBASE) ===
Co-located with the Standby Brigade HQ in Addis Ababa, Ethiopia, the EASF Logistics Base functions as the central base for all logistic procedures of the Force - that is to maintain, store and manage the logistical infrastructure. Member States dispatch personnel, material and other resources to the Logistics Base to be maintained and provided for purposes of training and operations of the Force. If necessary, the base performs under the mandate and direct control of the African Union.

== Mission scenarios ==
The Maputo Report and The Policy Framework for the Establishment of the African Standby Force (ASF) from May 2003 mentions six scenarios for the deployment of the regional contingents of the Force in Peace Support Operations (PSOs), ascending in their complexity of structures, management efforts and resources for deployment and sustainment.

- Scenario 1: AU/Regional military advice to a political mission
- Scenario 2: AU/Regional observer mission co-deployed with a UN mission
- Scenario 3: Stand-alone AU/Regional observer mission
- Scenario 4: AU/Regional Peacekeeping force for Chapter VI and preventive deployment missions (and peace-building)
- Scenario 5: AU peacekeeping force for complex multi-dimensional peacekeeping missions, including those involving low-level spoilers
- Scenario 6: AU intervention, e.g. in genocide situations where the international community does not act promptly

As long-term goals for the deployment of the Force, it was planned that scenario 1-4 should be able to deploy in 30 days (possible only if pre-mandate actions have been taken), scenario 5 should complete deployment in 90 days, with the military component being able to deploy in 30 days (possible only if pre-mandate actions have been undertaken), and finally, Scenario 6, implied that will be important the AU can deploy a robust military force in 14 days.

According to the Policy Framework, in a move towards standardized regional Standby Forces, they will be optimized for scenario 4.

ASF Roadmap III demanded the six mission scenarios for PSOs to be revised and adapted to new paradigms of peacekeeping.

== Training exercises ==
According to EASF, completing a first cycle of exercise, the Force reached its Initial Operating Capability (IOC) in late 2009. Parts of this cycle were a Command Post Exercise (CPX) in Nairobi, Kenya in 2008, and a Field Training Exercise (FTX) in Djibouti in November 2009. In the second cycle, EASF first conducted a Logistics Mapping Exercise (LogMAPEX) in Addis Ababa, Ethiopia in November 2010, followed by a second CPX in Khartoum, Sudan in November 2011 and a second FTX in Jinja, Uganda in May 2013. The latter involved 1,290 participants (military, police, civilian) and was intended to test EASF's deployment and mission implementation capability. EASF further conducted a CPX in Ethiopia in December 2014, after which its Full Operational Capability was declared. A third FTX took place in November 2017 in Port Sudan, Republic of The Sudan for 1,029 participants drawn from the 10 Member States.

== Deployment ==
From 2012 to 2013, EASF deployed fourteen officers in a one-year mission as part of a technical team that supported the African Union Mission in Somalia (AMISOM) during the establishment.
