= Partido Social Cristiano =

Partido Social Cristiano may refer to:

(Alphabetical by country)

- Christian Democratic Party (Bolivia), founded as Partido Social Cristiano in 1954
- Social Christian Party (Bolivia), split from the Christian Democratic Party in 1978 (defunct)
- Christian Social Party (Chile)
- Christian Social Party (Ecuador)
- Nicaraguan Social Christian Party
- Christian Social Party (Peru) (defunct)
- Christian Social Party of Peru (defunct)
- Copei, a political party in Venezuela
