= African Standby Force =

Multidisciplinary peacekeeping force

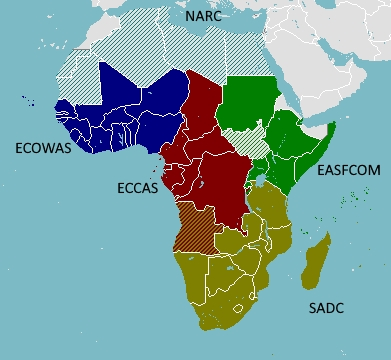
Map of the partitioning of RECs and RMs of the ASF

The African Standby Force (ASF) (French: Force africaine en attente) is an international, African continental, and multidisciplinary peacekeeping force with military, police and civilian contingents that acts under the direction of the African Union. The ASF is to be deployed in times of crisis in Africa. Addis Ababa, Ethiopia, serves as the Force's Headquarters. Douala, Cameroon, was selected in 2011 as the site of the AU's Continental Logistics Base (LOGBASE).

In 2003, a 2010 operational date for the force was set, and subsequently missed.

== Origins ==
Before the founding of the African Union (AU) in 2001, its predecessor Organisation of African Unity (OAU) did not provide appropriate tools for a collective and comprehensive acting of African states in times of violent crisis, mostly due to the shared value of non-interference into the internal affairs of states. During the 1990s, a series of violent conflicts in Africa, most importantly the 1994 Genocide in Rwanda, urged the African states for a change in their common security collaboration. After the establishment of the AU in 2001, the non-interference clause of OAU was not longer valid. The Constitutive Act now gave the AU the right to intervene in a member state in grave circumstances, namely war crimes, genocide and crimes against humanity.

The same year, a new African Peace and Security Architecture (APSA) was presented, in order to build and strengthen African capacities for managing and resolving conflicts on the continent. The APSA comprises five pillars that complement one another: A Peace and Security Council, a Continental Early Warning System, a Panel of the Wise, a Peace Fund, and an African Standby Force. The ASF is therefore a constituting element of the APSA.

The establishment of the ASF was directed by the Protocol Relating to the Establishment of the Peace and Security Council of the African Union, which was signed in July 2002 and entered into force in December 2003. The key document explicitly recognized the roles of the RECs in promoting peace and security in Africa.

For that reason, the final concept for the ASF, presented in the Maputo Report of July 2003, at the time provided for five regional Standby Brigade forces: A North Africa Regional Standby Brigade (NASBRIG), an East Africa Standby Brigade (EASBRIG); a Force Multinationale de l'Afrique Centrale (FOMAC); a Southern Africa Standby Brigade (SADCBRIG); and an ECOWAS Standby Brigade (ECOBRIG). The same document defined six ASF deployment Scenarios. The organization at that time agreed on force levels of about 15,000 soldiers continentwide.

The ASF Policy Framework Document from May 2003 aimed the development of the ASF in two phases:

- Phase One (up to 30 June 2005): The AU's envisaged the establishment a strategic level management capacity for the management of Scenarios 1-2 missions, while Regional Economic Communities (RECs)/Regions would complement the African Union (AU) by establishing regional standby forces up to a brigade size to achieve up to Scenario 4.
- Phase Two (1 July 2005 to 30 June 2010): By the year 2010, the AU planned to have developed the capacity to manage complex peacekeeping operations, while the RECs/Regions will continue to develop the capacity to deploy a Mission Headquarters (HQs) for Scenario 4, involving AU/Regional peacekeeping forces.

Three ASF Roadmaps were developed to guide the operalization of ASF:

- Roadmap I (adopted in March 2005) covered the period from June 2006 to March 2008
- Roadmap II (adopted in April 2008) covered the period from April 2008 to December 2010
- Roadmap III (adopted in December 2010) covered the period from December 2010 to December 2015

The ASF Roadmap III recognized that most goals of Phase One were not met until 2010 and therefore set the date for the achievement of the Full Operational Capability (FOC) to 2015. In December 2013, an assessment of the African Standby Force by an AU Panel of Experts concluded that the ASF is unlikely to achieve FOC in 2015 without major efforts made by all stakeholders.

== Composition ==
Article 13 of the Protocol Relating to the Establishment of the Peace and Security Council (PSC) of the African Union (AU) foresaw an ASF to be composed of standby multidisciplinary contingents, with civilian and military components in their countries of origin and ready for rapid deployment at appropriate notice. For that purpose, the protocol urged the member states to take steps to establish standby contingents for participation in peace support missions decided on by the PSC or intervention authorized by the AU Assembly. The strength and types of such contingents, their degree of readiness and general location should be determined in so-called Peace Support Standard Operating Procedures (SOPs), and shall be subject to periodic reviews depending on prevailing crisis and conflict situations.

== Mandate ==
According to the PSC Protocol, signed in 2002, the ASF should enable the PSC to perform its responsibilities. Article 13 of the protocol specifically directs the following functions to the ASF:

- observation and monitoring missions;
- other types of peace support missions;
- intervention in a Member State in respect of grave circumstances or at the request of a Member State in order to restore peace and security, in accordance with Article 4(h) and (j) of the Constitutive Act;
- preventive deployment in order to prevent

i. a dispute or a conflict from escalating,
ii. an ongoing violent conflict from spreading to neighboring areas or States, and
iii. the resurgence of violence after parties to a conflict have reached an agreement.;

- peace-building, including post-conflict disarmament and demobilization;
- humanitarian assistance to alleviate the suffering of civilian population in conflict areas and support efforts to address major natural disasters; and
- any other functions as may be mandated by the Peace and Security Council or the Assembly.

According to the protocol, the ASF is suggested to cooperate with the United Nations and its Agencies, other relevant international organizations and regional organizations, as well as with national authorities and NGOs, where appropriate. The detailed tasks of the ASF and its modus operandi for each authorized mission are to be considered and approved by the Peace and Security Council upon recommendation of the commission.

== Mission scenarios ==
The Maputo Report and The Policy Framework for the Establishment of the ASF from May 2003 mentions six scenarios for the deployment of the regional contingents of the Force in Peace Support Operations (PSOs), ascending in their complexity of structures, management efforts and resources for deployment and sustainment.

Scenario 1: AU/Regional military advice to a political mission
Scenario 2: AU/Regional observer mission co-deployed with a UN mission
Scenario 3: Stand-alone AU/Regional observer mission
Scenario 4: AU/Regional Peacekeeping force for Chapter VI and preventive deployment missions (and peace-building)
Scenario 5: AU peacekeeping force for complex multi-dimensional peacekeeping missions, including those involving low-level spoilers
Scenario 6: AU intervention, e.g. in genocide situations where the international community does not act promptly

As long-term goals for the deployment of the Force, it was planned that scenario 1-4 should be able to deploy in 30 days (possible only if pre-mandate actions have been taken), scenario 5 should complete deployment in 90 days, with the military component being able to deploy in 30 days (possible only if pre-mandate actions have been undertaken), and finally, Scenario 6, implied that will be important the AU can deploy a robust military force in 14 days.

The ASF Roadmap III demanded the six mission scenarios for PSOs to be revised and adopted to new paradigms of Peacekeeping.

== Rapid Deployment Capability ==
The ASF Policy Framework and the Roadmap for the Operationalization of the ASF called for the establishment of a "Rapid Deployment Capability" (RDC) capable of intervening, within fourteen days, in cases of genocide and gross human rights abuses under Scenario 6. The RDC was decided to be an integral part of the regional Standby Forces to be deployed at the entry point, as a precursor to the deployment of a larger mission. At the end of 2013, the Expert Panel of the AU stated that the goal, recommended in Roadmap III, to test, evaluate and operationalize the RDC by 2012, was not met.

== Current status ==
=== Exercises ===
From 2008 until 2010, the training and capacity building cycle AMANI AFRICA I (meaning “peace in Africa,” in Swahili), designed to evaluate the effectiveness ASF for an AU mandated peace support operation (PSO) was conducted by the African Union in collaboration with the European Union. It climaxed in the first continental exercise, called a Command Post Exercise (CPX), of this kind in Addis Ababa. AMANI AFRICA I focused mostly on validating policies and processes, at the continental strategic level, in employing the African Standby Force within the broader African Peace and Security Architecture (APSA). According to the AU, it provided objective evidence to support proposals for further organizational and operational developments of training, procedures and multidimensional capacities of the ASF.

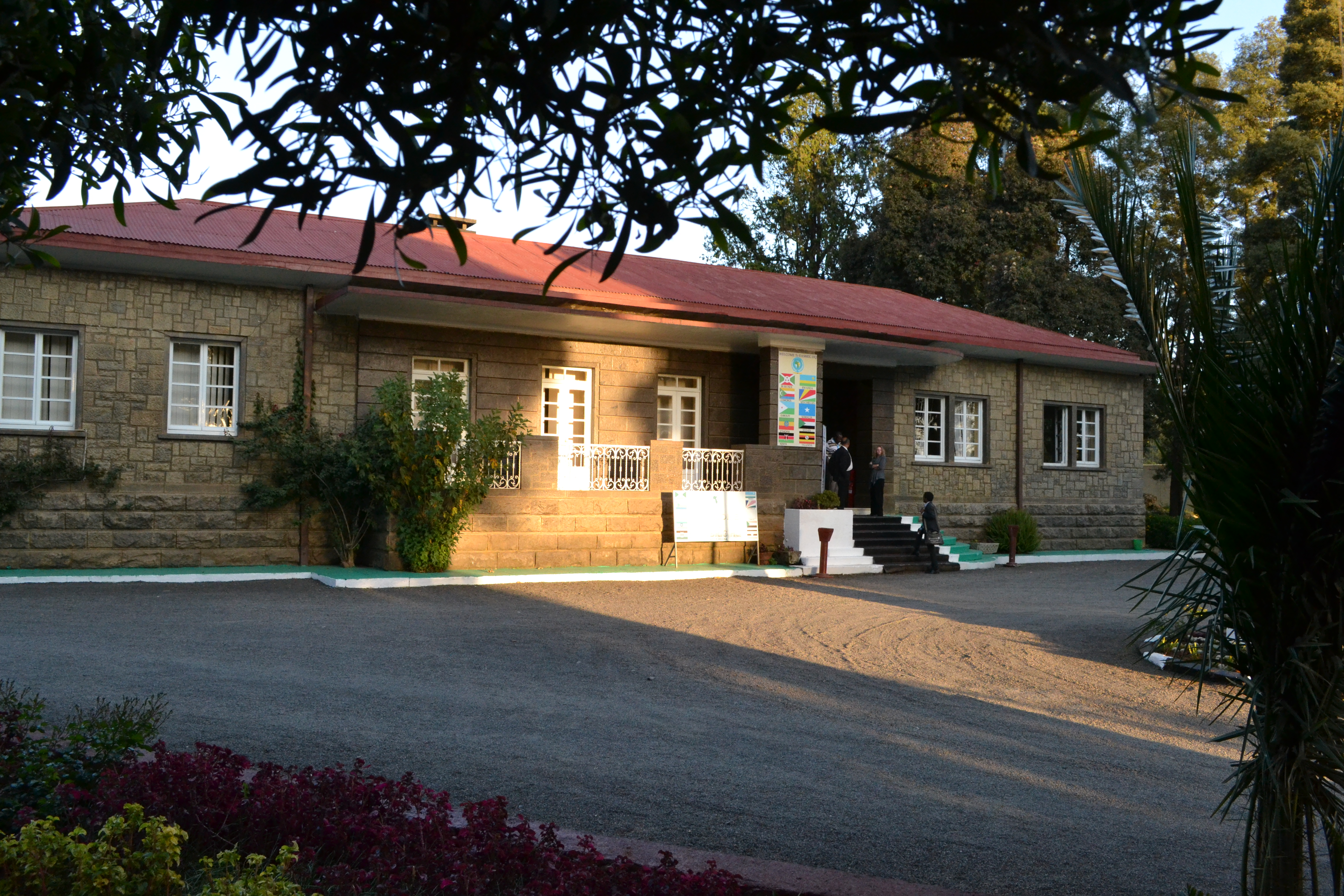
EASTBRIG Headquarters during Exercise Amani Africa I (2012)

The African Union Commission (AUC) is planning to conduct a field training exercise (FTX) in October 2014 in Lesotho at the climax of an ongoing training cycle known as AMANI AFRICA II. According to the AU, the AMANI AFRICA II cycle aims at enabling the ASF to achieve its FOC by 2015 and especially at "validating the capacity of the African Union to grant a mandate for the use of a Rapid Deployment Capability, as an initial operation for scenario six and lead in the process, a fully-fledged multidimensional peace operation (scenario 5)."

Each regional force is not on the same level of development.

In January 2006 Ishaya Hassan of Nigeria was promoted to major general and assigned as the chief of the standby force staff, located in Addis Ababa. Hassan later died, and as of 2007(?) (2013?) no replacement had been found. The position was vacant for at least three years.

=== North African Regional Capacity ===
The North African Regional Capacity or North African Region Capability was created to fill a sub-regional vacuum in North Africa. The Arab Maghreb Union (AMU) has been dormant since its establishment in 1989. Throughout the last two decades, revitalizing the AMU proved to be very difficult due to political dynamics amongst member states. Thus, there was a need to create a regional mechanism to enable North African countries to contribute to the African Standby Force. This is why in mid 2007 a memorandum of understanding was drafted to establish NARC.

In the absence of a joint secretariat to coordinate cooperation amongst NARC member states, Libya voluntarily played this role during the initial phase of starting up NARC which lasted for three years (2005-2008). Later on, the second meeting of NARC Ministers of Defence held in Tripoli in December 2008 approved a recommendation to establish an executive secretariat to be located in Tripoli. Subsequently, the NARC Executive Secretariat and Planning Element were inaugurated in April 2009. It was however, expected that staff from other member states will join the Executive Secretariat and PLANELM in September 2010. While both Egypt and Algeria had identified staff for the two elements, these countries were yet to sign the hosting agreement with Libya, and in some cases the deployment of staff was constrained by domestic considerations including promotions and retirements. Meanwhile, progress in generating the civilian officers for the PLANELM lagged even further behind; this essentially meant that the NARC PLANELM was purely military in 2010.

While the Brigade HQ to be located in Cairo and the two logistic depots to be located in Algiers and Cairo have been identified, they have yet to be made operational, due to political and bureaucratic constraints within the member states. Furthermore, it seems that creating, rostering and deploying a civilian component is somewhat problematic due to the voluntary and individualistic nature of this component and the lack of AU strategic guidance in this regard.

It was reported via the Africa Research Bulletin that U.S. Army Africa's commanding general, Major General William B. Garrett III, had made a visit in early May 2010 to Tripoli to discuss relationships between the United States and Libyan land forces. He met Libya's chief of staff for Army Mechanised Units and executive director of the NARC, Major General Ahmed Oun.

On 28 May 2010, the NARC Executive Secretary, Major-General Ahmed Oun, signed, on behalf of NARC, the memorandum of understanding on cooperation between the African Union, the Regional Economic Communities and the Regional Standby Brigades of Eastern Africa and Northern Africa, at the Headquarters of the African Union in Addis Ababa.

It was reported in January 2011 by Magharebia that Algeria was to host the NARC headquarters. Under an agreement made on Tuesday, January 25, 2011, Algeria was planned to become the seat of both NARC headquarters and the force's administration.

The "Arab Spring" (2011) led to a major setback in the establishment of the NARC.

Members include Algeria, Egypt, Libya, and Western Sahara. Morocco and Mauritania are now more closely associated with ECOWAS peace efforts, and Tunisia did not become actively involved in the NARC.

=== ECOWAS Standby Force ===
Members: Ghana, Nigeria, Benin, Togo, Côte d'Ivoire, Guinea, Guinea Bissau, Liberia, Sierra Leone, Mali, Senegal, Niger, Burkina Faso, Gambia, and Cape Verde

The ECOWAS Standby Force (ESF) is a standby arrangement made up of military, police and civilian components and which is consistent with Chapter VIII of the United Nations Charter which provides for regional peace and security arrangements. A partial legal basis is given by Article 21 of the ECOWAS Protocol Relating to the Mechanism for Conflict Prevention, Management, Resolution, Peacekeeping and Security of December 1999.

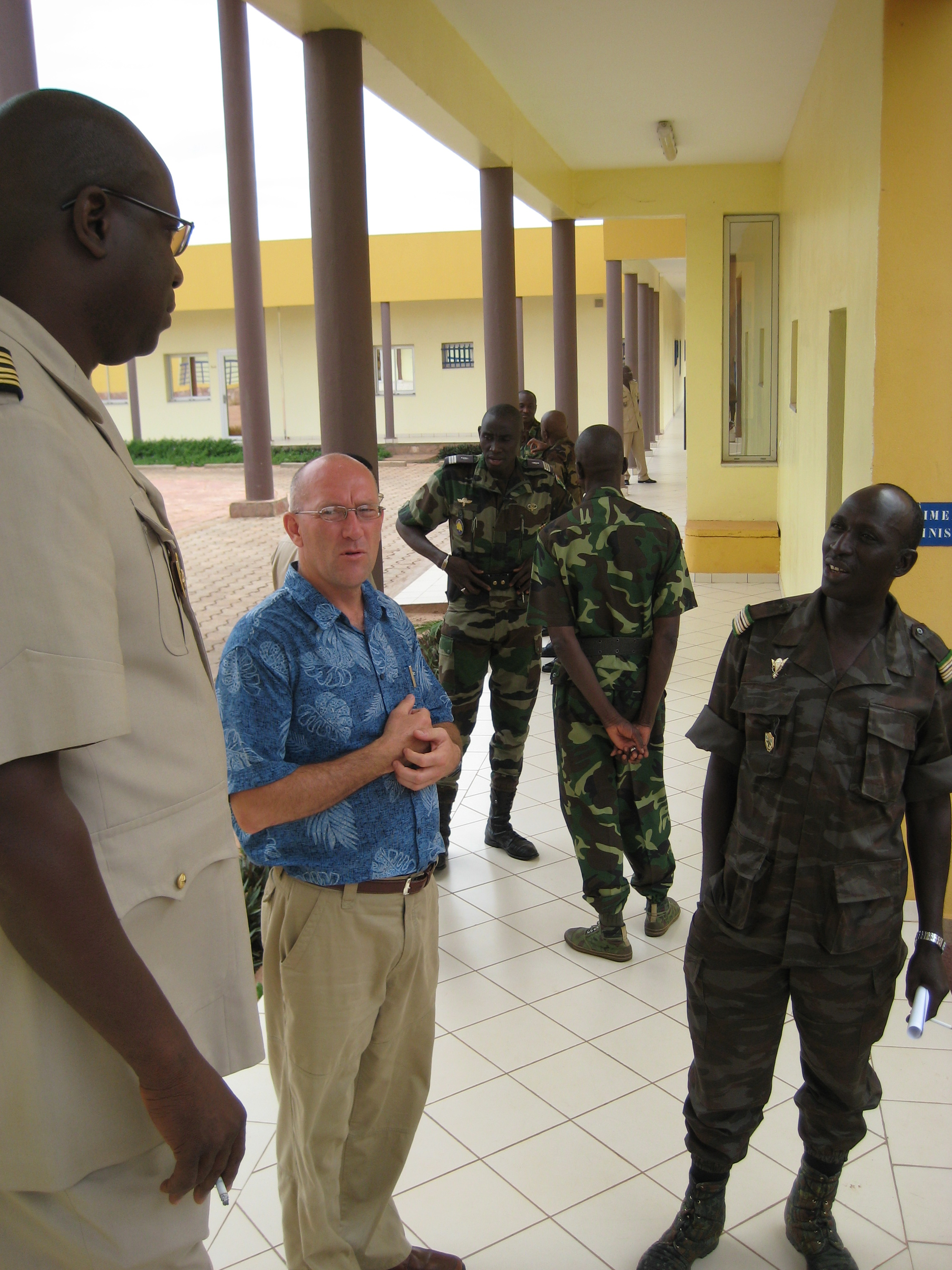
ECOWAS Standby Force HQ staff attending a DDR course at the EMP Bamako (2007)

In 2005, a team of ECOWAS P3 Development Partners (AU, EU, USA, UK, Canada, Denmark, France, Germany and Netherlands), the UN Standby High-Readiness Brigade (SHIRBRIG) together with the ECOWAS Mission Planning Management Cell (MPMC) met and produced an overarching framework document for the operationalisation of the ESF. The ECOWAS Operational Framework phased the process by first of all establishing an ESF Task Force (ESFTF) with 2773 soldiers of all ranks which was certified in 2009 in the form of a logistics exercise. The Task Force is structured into two infantry battalions (Western and Eastern) and a composite logistics battalion. The Western Battalion is led by Senegal while the Eastern Battalion is led by Nigeria.

The ECOWAS Main Force was intended to number 3727, to build to complete a brigade of 6500 of all ranks to be ready by 2010. The initial Task Force is intended to be rapidly deployed and then the more robust, long-term Main Force is required afterwards.

There is no formal memorandum of understanding between the ECOWAS Secretariat and the ECOWAS members states on Force generation. However, the memorandum of understanding has been drafted, and meanwhile (2010), there is a firm commitment of the different states leaders to provide personnel and facilities to facilitate any deployment of the Force.

The headquarters (HQ) of both the ESF and the ESFTF are co-located in Abuja, Nigeria. However, the Planning Element of the ESF is weak compared to the Task Force PLANELM. For now (2010), the PLANELM of ESF has no civilian component. The military and police components are fully operational. The Logistic Depot of the Force, still to be built, is planned to be established at Freetown, Sierra Leone. Land has been allocated in this regard by the government of Sierra Leone, and the US government is providing support for the establishment of the Logistics depot.

In the violent conflict in Mali since 2012, ESF could not operate in a timely manner to prevent a further escalation of violence in the country.

=== ECCAS Standby Force ===
The Multinational Force of Central Africa (FOMAC) is a non-permanent African multinational armed force under the aegis of the Economic Community of States of Central Africa (ECCAS).

Members include São Tomé and Príncipe, Cameroon, Central African Republic, Gabon, Chad, Equatorial Guinea, Republic of the Congo, Angola, Burundi, and Democratic Republic of the Congo.

Made up of military contingents from ECCAS member states, its aim is to carry out peace, security and humanitarian aid missions. It is called upon to intervene in particular in the event of aggression or conflicts in any Member State, internal conflicts or in the event of overthrow of the constitutional institutions of a Member State.

The ECCAS Standby Force, or in French, Force Multinationale de l’Afrique Centrale (FOMAC), was established in 2006 at the ECCAS Yaoundé Summit. It was established under the framework of ECCAS’ Peace and Security Council, known as COPAX. The COPAX is the decision making organ of the ECCAS on all issues concerning peace and security.

The absence of a formal memorandum of understanding between ECCAS and its Members States relating to FOMAC remains a big obstacle. The only binding legal framework governing the FOMAC is the document known as "Catalo 2010", signed February 28, 2008 in Libreville, Gabon by Member States. Under this arrangement, Members States pledged a force of 4800 (police, military and civilians) personnel and 6 airlift aircraft.

The Planning Element (PLANELM) of the FOMAC was established in July 2006 in Libreville, and it consists of representatives from the various ECCAS member states. ECCAS has opted for a big multidimensional Planning Element of 36 out of which 24 are already sitting. ECCAS has opted for a non-permanent Brigade headquarters. In their view, the brigade headquarters would be established when a peace operation is authorized and would then be led by an individual State or a group of States, in coordination with the PLANELM. ECCAS has not developed yet a Rapid Deployment Capability (RDC).

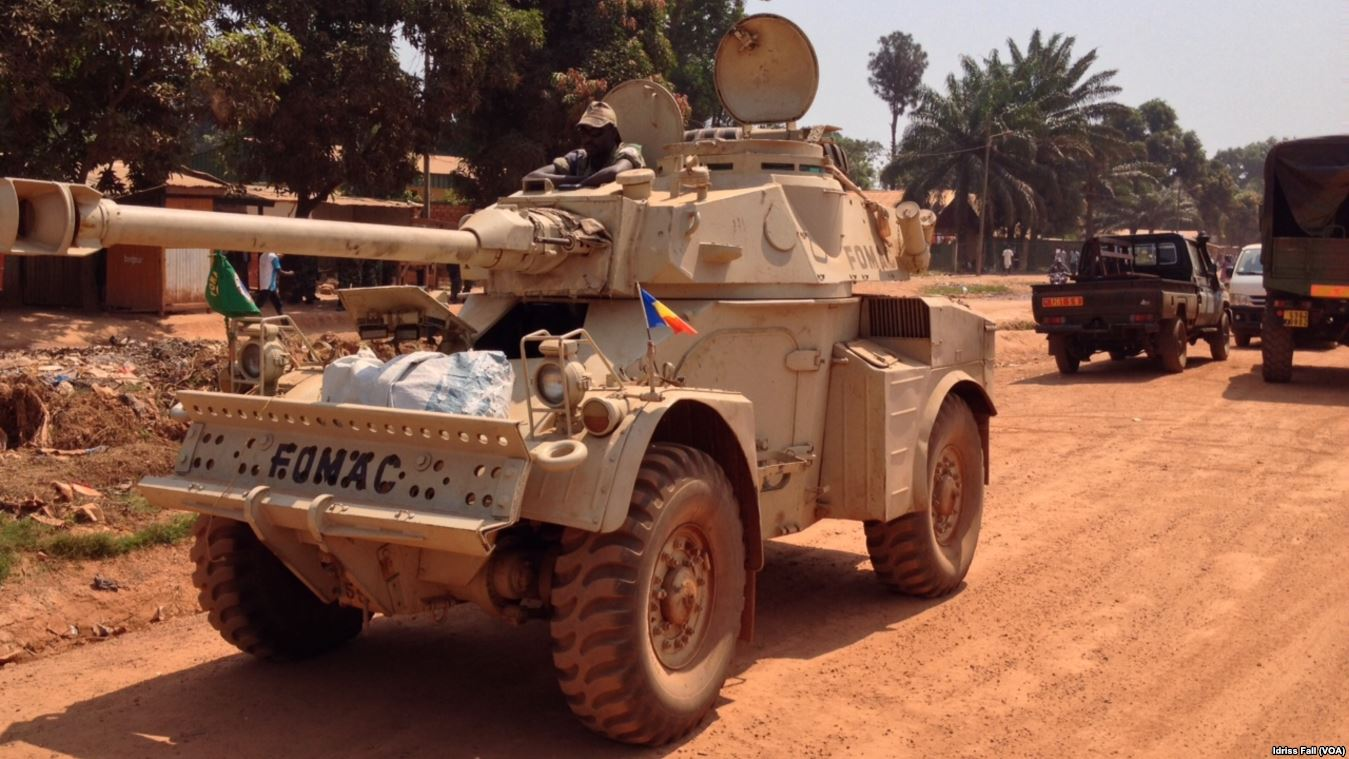
A Chadian Panhard AML armored vehicle from FOMAC deployed to Bangui in April 2013.

FOMAC was deployed to the Central African Republic as part of the Peace Consolidation Mission in the Central African Republic (MICOPAX).

=== Eastern Africa Standby Force ===
Members: Burundi, Comoros, Djibouti, Ethiopia, Kenya, Rwanda, Seychelles, Somalia, Sudan and Uganda

In the East of the continent, the regional agent of ASF is known as the Eastern Africa Standby Force (EASF), since 2007 led by a Coordination Mechanism (EASFCOM). While ECOWAS, SADC and ECCAS have established PLANELMs within their respective regional protocols already in place, the EASF is an entirely different regional arrangement co-existing with several East African communities.

The EASF operates with the vision to contribute to regional and continental peace and stability in the region, through a fully operational and multidimensional joint and integrated Eastern Standby Force ready for deployment by 2015, with an Initial Operational Capability by 2010. In this regard, EASF has developed a Strategic Development Plan 2010-2015 approved during the second Ordinary Summit of the Heads of State and Government held in Moroni, Comoros, in March 2010.

EASF's Brigade HQ and Logistics Base (LOGBASE) are both located at Addis Ababa, Ethiopia, while the Planning Element (PLANELM) is co-located with EASFCOM in Nairobi, Kenya. All 10 EASF Members States are represented within the PLANELM.

The PLANELM is conducting capacity building activities within itself as well as within Members States of the region to ensure that all the multidimensional elements of the Force are on standby in their respective countries for AU peace support operations. In this regard, the International Peace Support Training Center (IPSTC), located opposite of EASFCOM in Nairobi, provides assistance.

Completing a first cycle of exercise, EASF reached its Initial Operating Capability (IOC) in late 2009. Completing the second cycle, EASF conducted a second FTX in Jinja, Uganda in May 2013. with 1,290 participants (military, police, civilian), to test EASF's deployment and mission implementation capability.

=== SADC Standby Brigade ===
The SADC Standby Brigade was launched on August 17, 2007, in Lusaka, Zambia, with, initially, a military and police component. A civilian component was added later. Intended to provide peace and security to the region, it was established by a memorandum of understanding that set out its functions and limitations, its methods of deployment, and its system of funding, command structure, and logistics. The member states agreed to contribute personnel and equipment and would be reimbursed by SADC where applicable.

The members who have signed the initial agreement include Angola, Botswana, the Democratic Republic of the Congo, Eswatini, Lesotho, Malawi, Mauritius, Madagascar, Namibia, South Africa, Tanzania, Zambia, Zimbabwe, and Mozambique.

The Planning Element (PLANELM) of the SADC Standby Force was established with the military, police and civilian components, but is experiencing shortfalls in staffing. The strategic level training of the Force is conducted under the framework of the Southern Africa Defense and Security Management (SADSEM) through a network of academic institutions while operational training is conducted by the Regional Peacekeeping Training Center (RPTC) located in Harare, Zimbabwe. Other capacity building and training activities are conducted through series of exercises in the region.

The Main Logistic Depot (MLD) will be built in Gaborone and the Government of Botswana has allocated land for the establishment of the depot. SADC, unlike other RECs and RMs, has limited number of partners due to a policy of self-reliance on issues of peace and security. SADC decided not to establish a permanent mission headquarters, but to do so only in the event of a deployment.

In late 2021 discussions were continuing on a Regional Logistics Depot.

=== Internal Revision ===
The ASF Roadmap III recognized major difficulties in the establishment of the ASF. Most importantly, it recognized that ASF was not able to reach its Full Operational Capability (FOC) by 2010, a goal that was set in previous Roadmaps and key documents. Therefore, the experts set the new date for the FOC to 2015. Furthermore, in the policy document it is observed that the ASF still lacked the ability to manage complex peacekeeping operations as specified in the ASF Roadmap II. Similarly, the AU experts ascertain that the RECs/RMs did not reach the full capacity to deploy a mission headquarters for Scenario 4 involving AU/regional forces. Other problems were seen in a low level of awareness and commitment among the different stakeholders as well as a lack of institutional capacity and effective coordination between the AU and RECs/RMs. Additionally, there was a slow development of the civil component in comparison with the other components. Concerning the political process, the Roadmap mentions that there was at the time no written procedure governing AU political decision making and subsequent Mission planning. Therefore, the experts stressed the need for the finalization and adoption of a comprehensive memorandum of understanding on the use of the ASF for AU mandated missions in order to clarify the relationship between the AU, RECs/RMs and member states.

The Roadmap also outlined several fields of progress in the development of the ASF. These achievements include the production of a set of common policy documents, an annual continental training program, and improved training standards within nations and standby forces that could be used collectively, albeit at an initial operational capability at the moment, mainly for logistic and institutional reasons. Notable progress was also ascertained in the development of a harmonized Rapid Deployment Capability (RDC) concept. Lastly, the Roadmap saw progress in the evolution of the police component, notably in the area of policy development and the establishment of management capabilities at the strategic level of the AU and the operational level of the RECs/RMs.

Achievements in the development of the Force to be reached in the period between 2010 and 2015, as stated in the Roadmap, are an "ASF Vision to be presented to AU Summit in January/February 2012; a staffed, trained and fully operational PSOD by December 2011; a fully operational RDC by December 2012, to be confirmed by the continental exercise AMANI AFRICA II; and finally, a fully operational ASF by December 2015 to be confirmed by the continental exercise AMANI AFRICA III."

From July to December 2013, the AU conducted an assessment of the status of development of the ASF through an Independent Panel of Experts. One of the findings of the assessment was that it would be unlikely for the ASF to reach its FOC until December 2015 without major efforts by all stakeholders.

== Criticism ==
One important criticism of the ASF is the accusation that, due to the delay in its establishment, the Force could not be used as a tool of peacemaking in the latest occurrence of crises in Africa, such as the fight against the Lord's Resistance Army in Uganda, the war in Somalia, as well as the ongoing conflict in Eastern D.R. Congo.

Another criticism is the fact that the RECs/RMs have very different perceptions on whether the AU or the UN should mandate the employment of the ASF. For instance, SADC and ECOWAS tend to prefer UN Security Council authorization. This lack of consensus on the mandatory authority leads to the AU's current inability to mandate a mission.

Furthermore, it was claimed that the UNSC would tend to caution against regional interventions without its authorization, whereas the AU would have interpreted the status of the PSC as a legitimate authority within the framework of Chapter VIII of the UN Charter relating to Regional Arrangements.

One major obstacle to assessing the achievement of ASF's FOC is a missing clear definition of the FOC.

== See also ==
- fr:École de maintien de la paix Alioune Blondin Beye de Bamako - the intermediate level peacekeeping school for the ECOWAS component of the ASF
- African Capacity for Immediate Response to Crises
