= North African Region Capability =

Military alliance in North Africa

NARC
- (en) North African Regional Capability (ar) قدرة إقليم شمال إفريقيا
- (Ar) قدرة إقليم شمال إفريقيا
- Abbreviation: NARC
- Founded at: Algiers
- Type: Military alliance
- Headquarters: Algiers, Algeria
- Region served: North Africa
- Members: 6 states: Algeria; Egypt; Libya; Mauritania; Sahrawi Republic; Tunisia
- Official language: Arabic and English
- Secretary General: Ahmed Tajouri
- Website: narc.org.ly

North African Regional Capability (NARC) (Arabic: قدرة إقليم شمال إفريقيا) is a military co-operation initiative between the countries of Algeria, Libya, Egypt, Tunisia, Mauritania and the Sahrawi Republic. It is intended to provide the North African contribution to the African Standby Force.

== Purpose ==
The North African Regional Capability (NARC) is a regional organization concerned with promoting peace, security, and stability on the continent according to the Protocol establishing the African Union's Peace and Security Council (PSC) and in particular Article 13 related to the African Standby Force (ASF).

== 10th meeting of the Defence Ministers Council NARC ==
The 10th meeting of the Council of Ministers of Defense of the North Africa Regional Capability (NARC) member states took place on May 6, 2023, in Algiers, Algeria [NARCLink]. Delegations from all NARC member states were present.

The meeting served several purposes:

- Evaluate NARC activities in 2022: This involved assessing the effectiveness of NARC's programs and initiatives throughout the previous year.
- Develop NARC's components: Discussions focused on how to improve NARC's different parts, potentially including its structure, resources, or areas of focus.
- Exchange views on regional security issues: The Defense Ministers likely conferred on shared security concerns and areas for collaboration among NARC member states.

General Saïd Chanegriha, Algeria's Chief of Staff, delivered opening remarks highlighting the importance of NARC and its role in regional security [MDN Algerian Ministry of National Defence].

While specific details of the discussions are not publicly available, the meeting likely served as a springboard for continued cooperation on defense and security matters between North African countries.

== North Africa Regional Capability Counterterrorism Study Session (2023) ==
The North Africa Regional Capability (NARC) Counterterrorism Study Session was a three-day event held in Cairo,

Egypt, from October 28th to 30th, 2023. Organized by the NARC Planning Element, the session brought together specialists and experts to discuss contemporary counterterrorism issues facing the African continent.

=== Participants ===
- NARC member states
- Representatives from economic groups and regional mechanisms on the African continent
- African Union Commission
- Specialists from various counterterrorism centers, including the Egyptian Center for Peacekeeping Training and the African Center for Terrorism Studies and Research

=== Focus ===
The study session aimed to address the evolving challenges of terrorism in Africa, particularly those faced by peacekeeping missions operating on the continent. Discussions likely centered on:

- Strategies for countering terrorist activities
- Challenges faced by peacekeeping missions due to terrorism
- Potential solutions and collaborative efforts

=== Significance ===
This session marked the first initiative at the African Union Commission level dedicated to studying counterterrorism and developing continental strategies.

It followed a previous NARC-organized study session on cyberterrorism held in Algeria in September 2023, highlighting NARC's growing role in addressing regional security concerns.

=== Outcomes ===
The NARC Executive Secretariat, in collaboration with participating centers, planned to compile the study session materials into reference booklets for specialists. While specific outcomes and recommendations haven't been publicly released, the session likely fostered collaboration and knowledge sharing among counterterrorism experts across Africa. in collaboration with participating centers, planned to compile the study session materials into reference booklets for specialists. While specific outcomes and recommendations haven't been publicly released, the session likely fostered collaboration and knowledge sharing among counterterrorism experts across Africa. Further Research

- Specific topics covered during the study session.
- Concrete outcomes and recommendations generated from the discussions.
- The future role of NARC in coordinating counterterrorism efforts in North Africa.

By investigating these aspects, a more comprehensive understanding of the session's significance and NARC's contributions to regional counterterrorism efforts can be achieved.
