= Ahmed Oun =

Libyan Army general (born 1946)

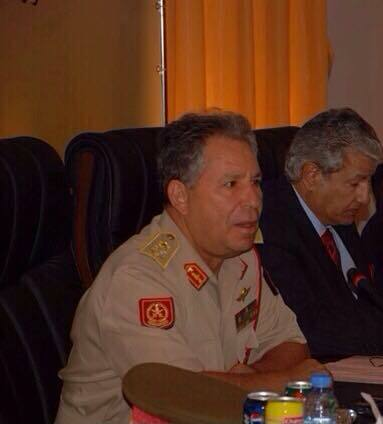
- Born: June 1, 1946 (age 80); Tripoli, Libya
- Occupations: Major General in the Libyan Army, Executive Secretary of NARC

Ahmed Oun (Arabic: احمد عون; born c. 1946) was a Major General in the Libyan Armed Forces. He was the head of Technical Affairs and Heavy weapons in the Ministry of Defense. In the late 2008 he was appointed as the Executive Secretary of the North African Regional Capabilities NARC by the North African Joint Chiefs, which is a part of the African Standby Force.

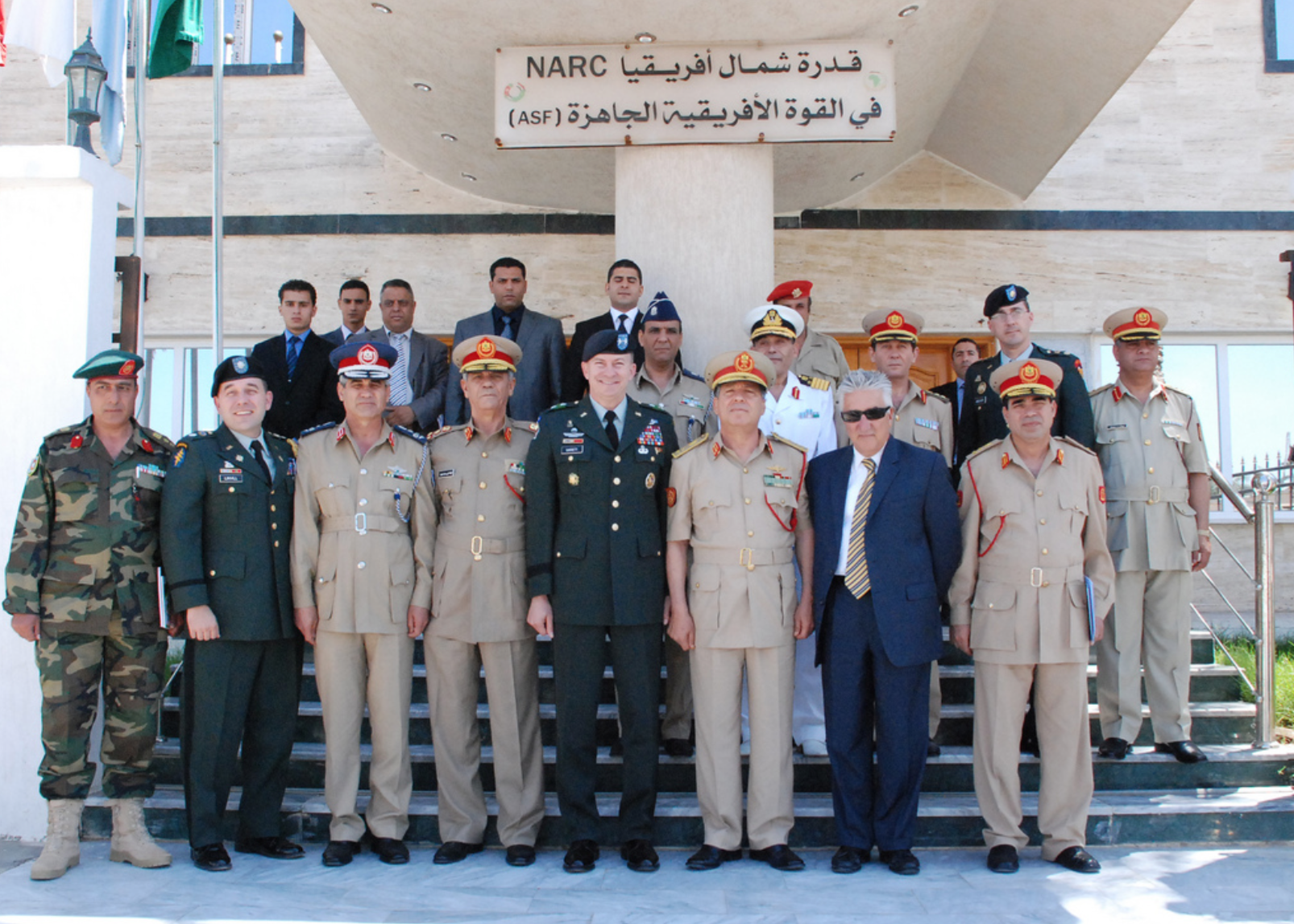
Gen Ahmed Oun Meeting with Gen. William B. Garrett III AFRICOM commander /Tripoli-Libya

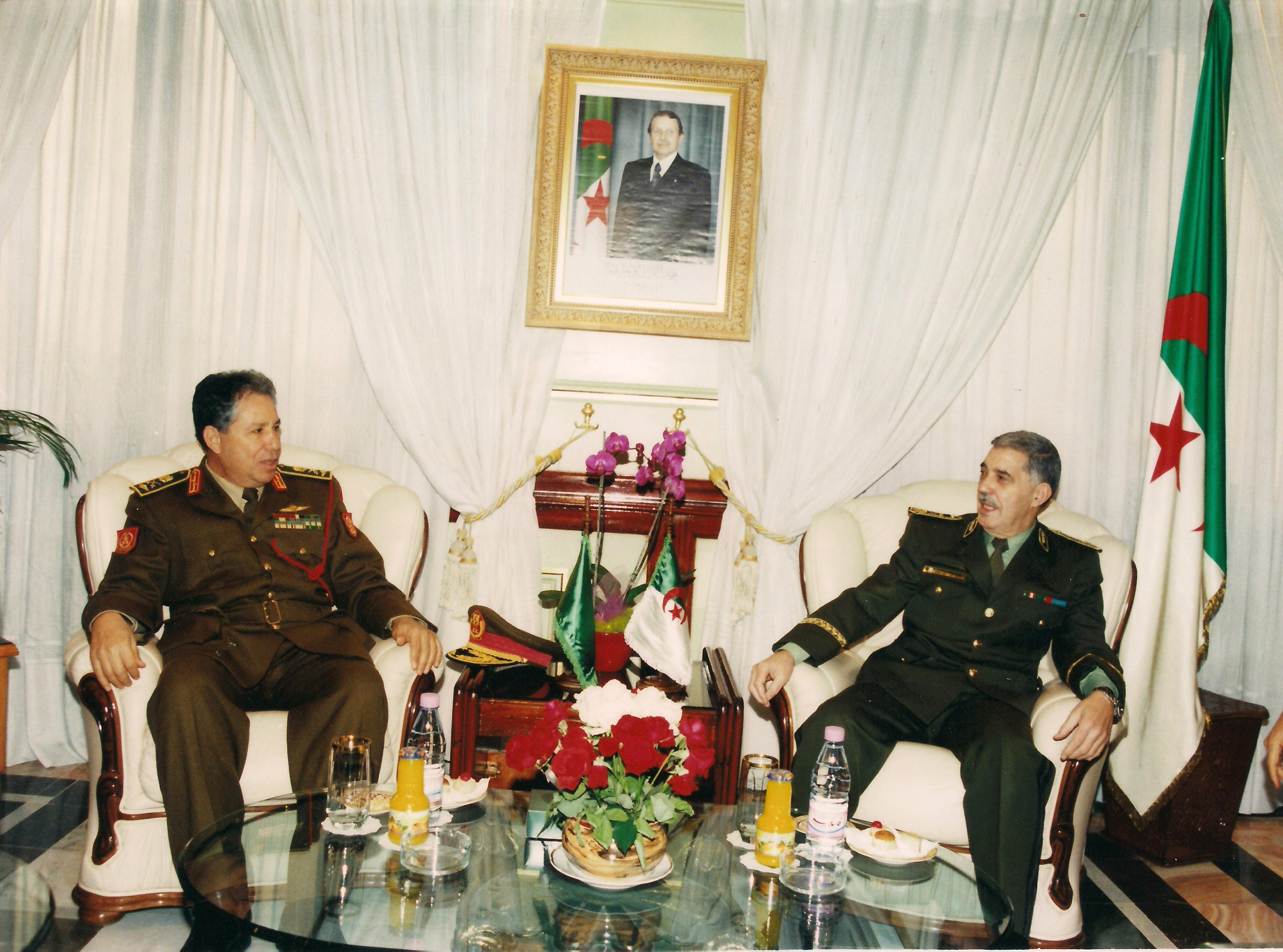
Ahmed Oun visit to Algeria

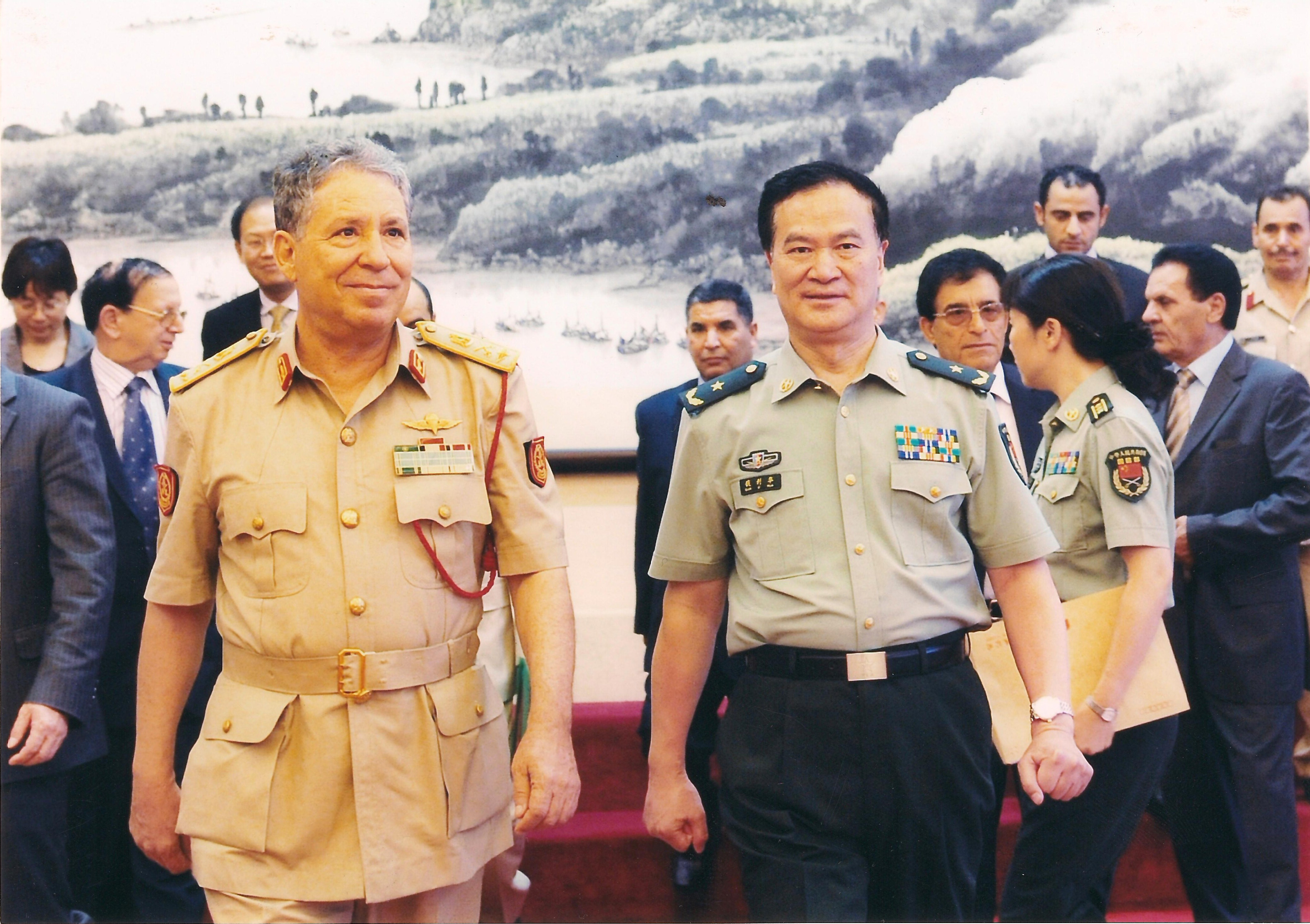
Ahmed Oun visit to China

== Early life and education ==
Ahmed Oun ( احمد عون) was born in 1946 in Tripoli, Bab al-Azizia. He was raised in the area between the British military camps and the remnants of Italian occupation in Al-Sreem Street. During that time, he and many Libyans of his generation were suffering from cruel life and disturbed economic conditions that the world experienced after the end of World War II. He was raised as an orphan as his father died while his mother was pregnant with him. He completed his education in Tripoli schools where he participated in student uprisings and demonstrations demanding the withdrawal of British and American troops from Libya.

== Career ==
In 1966, after earning a high school diploma and because of his early sense of patriotism, he left his family to join the Royal Military Academy in Benghazi. He graduated in 1968 then he was directed to the Signal Corp as an Army Signal officer. Shortly after, he joined the Movement of the Free Officers Unionists, which was a secret movement at that time, to be the youngest officer to join the movement. Then he left for a Military Signal course in the U.S.A. He then returned to participate in the revolution (Al-Fatah September 1969) that was done by the Libyan Army, which ended the era of the royal power.

At the end of 1969, he participated in the delegation that was in charge of negotiating the evacuation of British and US troops and bases from Libya, which successfully led to the evacuation. Later he volunteered with a group of Libyans to join The Popular Front for the Liberation of Palestine, at its headquarters in Gota in Damascus – Syria, to help them in Liberation of their country.

At the end of 1969, he participated in the delegation that was in charge of negotiating the evacuation of British and US troops and bases from Libya. Later he volunteered with a group of Libyans to join Popular Front for the Liberation of Palestine, at his headquarters in Ghouta in Damascus – Syria.

During his time with the Libyan Army, he held various commands and worked his way through that ranks till becoming a Major General in 2004 as the head of Technical Affairs and Heavy Weapons in the Libyan army.

== Battles ==
Ahmed Oun commanded in the military operation against Chadian troops in 1986. He was in charge of Libyan troops that were defending the Doom Valley front in the border region between the two countries. General Ahmed Oun was deactivated by seif al Islam al ghadafi prior to the 2011 uprising, which made him stand against the regime claiming he wanted to reduce civilian casualties and save the lives of Libyans, saying that his beliefs and principles won’t allow him to participate of the killing of civilians.

== Positions ==
- 1968 - 1969 Head of Signal Section Camp Garyounes - Benghazi
- 1969 - 1970 Commander of Armored Vehicles Section Ben Younes – Benghazi
- 1970 - 1977 Commander of the Guardian Infantry Battalion Bab al-Azizia - Tripoli
- 1977 - 1988 Head Master of the Military School Tripoli
- 1988 - 1989 Commander of the 6th Brigade Infantry Al-Bombh Bay
- 1989 - 1990 Deputy Chief of Operations and Training Bab al-Azizia - Tripoli
- 1990 - 1994 Chief of The Guard Brigade Tripoli
- 1994 - 1995 Chief of Operations and Training Jufrah
- 1995 - 2001 Chairman of the Military Sports Federation Tripoli
- 1999 - 2011 Head of Technical Affairs Tripoli / Jufrah
- 2008 - Executive Secretary of NARC Tripoli

== Education ==
- 1968 Signal and Communications Diploma Benghazi
- 1969 Maintenance of Military Communication Systems U.S.A
- 1970 Armored Vehicles Course Tripoli
- 1970 Infantry Heads Course Egypt
- 1975 Advanced Infantry Course Benghazi
- 1981 Parachute Training Benghazi
- 1981 Head of Infantry Brigades Diploma Czechoslovakia
- 1985 Chief and Command Diploma Czechoslovakia

== Awards and Medals ==
- Medal of Bravery in 1970
- Order of the Republic Military Units in 1970
- Medal of Military Duty – first class – in 1974
- Medal of Military Duty – second class – in 1989
- Medal of Military Training – first class – in 1973
- Medal of Military Training – second class – in 1982
- Medal of voluntary service and a good manners
- Medal of the Arab Mujahideen
- Medal of the Arab Union
