= Christian Social Party of Peru =

Christian Social Party of Peru (Spanish: Partido Social Cristiano del Perú) was a political party in Peru founded in 1946. Víctor Cárcamo was the president of the organizing committee.
