= Christian Social Party (Peru) =

Christian Social Party (Spanish: Partido Social Cristiano) was a political party in Peru. Its president was Baltazar Caravedo.
