= African Committee of Experts on the Rights and Welfare of the Child =

The African Committee of Experts on the Rights and Welfare of the Child (ACERWC) was formed in July 2001, one and half years after the African Charter on the Rights and Welfare of the Child came into force. The Committee became operational in 2003.

== Mission ==
The ACERWC draws its mandate from articles 32–46 of the African Charter on the Rights and Welfare of the Child (ACRWC), which was adopted by the Organization of African Unity (OAU) Heads of State and Government on 11 July 1990 and came into force on 29 November 1999. As of July 2024, 51 AU Member States had ratified the Charter and five were still to ratify: Morocco, Somalia, South Sudan and Tunisia. (See https://au.int/treaties for the full list, including reservations by four ratifying states.)

== ACERWC committee members–experts ==
The Committee is made of eleven members who are elected by the Assembly of Heads of State and Government of the African Union. They serve in their personal capacities. They are elected by secret ballot from a list of people nominated by State Parties to the Charter (ACRWC Charter, article 34). Members were traditionally elected by the Executive Council and appointed by the Assembly. In February 2020, the Assembly decided to delegate its authority to the Executive Council to appoint members (Assembly/AU/Dec.760(XXXIII)).

Candidates are required to be of high moral standing, integrity, impartiality and competence in matters of the rights and welfare of children. Under the Charter, terms are for five years, but to avoid the departure of all 11 members after the first term, article 37 provided for the terms of two members to expire after two years and six after four years, as determined in a draw of lots by the AU Assembly Chairperson immediately after the first election. Article 37 originally stated that members could not be re-elected. In January 2015, the AU Assembly adopted an amendment to article 37(1) to provide for members to be re-elected once for a five-year term (Assembly/AU/Dec.548(XXIV)). The amendment entered into force on its adoption.

Bureau members are elected from within the Committee for two-year terms (article 38).

The criteria for the selection of members are:

1. Members must be nationals of a State Party to the Children's Charter (i.e. a country that is a signatory);
2. They must be individuals of high moral standing, integrity, impartiality and competence in matters of the rights and welfare of the child;
3. Members are nominated by signatory countries and elected by the Assembly of Heads of State of the African Union;
4. Members are elected for a term of five years and serve voluntarily in their individual capacity. They can be re-elected for one term following an amendment to article 37(1).

== Statutory meetings ==
The Committee holds ordinary sessions twice a year, and an extraordinary session when necessary. Proceedings of the Committee’s sessions are available at www.acerwc.africa/sessions. Ordinary Session is the venue where States parties reports, CSOs complementary reports, communications, request for investigation and other requests submitted before the Committee are being examined. Some activities during the sessions are open while others are restricted.

The Committee may also convene various meetings, seminars and workshops in line with its promotional mandate.

== Current Committee members ==
The committee are elected and appointed by the Executive Council for five-year terms.

The current members of the ACERWC are (name, country, position):

- Wilson Almeida Adão, Angola, Chairperson
- Aver Gavar, Nigeria, Vice Chairperson
- Anne Musiwa, Zimbabwe
- Poloko Nuggert Ntshwarang, Botswana
- Aboubekrine El Jera, Mauritania
- Ghislain Roch Etsan, Republic of the Congo
- Hermine Kembo Takam Gatsing, Cameroon
- Sabrina Gahar, Algeria
- Robert Doya Nanima, Uganda
- Karoonawtee Chooramun, Mauritius

== Former Committee members ==
=== West Africa ===
- Dirius Dialé Dore (Guinea) 2001–2003
- Dior Fall Sow (Senegal) 2001–2005
- Jean-Baptiste Zoungrana (Burkina Faso) 2003–2008
- Peter Ebigbo (Nigeria) 2003–2008
- Nakpa Polo (Togo) 2003–2008
- Seynabou Ndiaye Diakhaté (Senegal) 2003–2008
- Marie Chantal Koffi Appoh (Cote d'Ivoire)
- Moussa Sissoko (Mali) 2005–2010
- Cyprien Adébayo Yanclo (Benin; First Vice Chair) 2007–2013
- Agnès Kabore Ouattara (Burkina Faso; Chair) 2007–2013
- Maryam Uwais (Nigeria) 2007–2013
- Aho Assouma Suzanne (Togo) 2013–2018
- Sidikou Aissatou Alassane Moulaye
- Nanike Nkewe

=== North Africa ===
- Dawlat Hassan (Egypt) 2006–2011
- Mme Fatima Delladj-Sebba (Algeria) 2010–2015
- Mme Amal Muhammad al-Hengari (Libya) 2010–2015
- Azza El Ashmawy (Egypt) 2013–2018
- Moushira Khattab

=== East Africa ===
- Benyam Dawit Mezmur
- Joyce Aluoch (Kenya) 20012005
- Rebecca MirembeNyanyintono (Uganda) 2001–2003
- Stratton Nsanzabaanwa (Rwanda) 2002005
- Assefa Bequele (Ethiopia) 2003–2008
- Martha Koome (Kenya) 2005–2010
- Felicité Muhimpundu (Rwanda) 2010–2015

=== Central Africa ===
- Rudolph Soh (Cameroon) 2001–2005
- Nanitom Motoyam (Chad) 2001–2005
- Joseph Ndayisenga

=== Southern Africa ===
- Julia Sloth-Nielsen (South Africa) 2011–2016
- Karabo Karabo Mohau (Lesotho) 2001–2003
- Louis Pierre Robert Ahnee (Mauritius) 20012005
- Lulu Tshiwula (South Africa) 2001–2005
- Mamosebi T. Pholo (Lesotho) 2005–2010
- Boipelo Lucia Seithlamo (Botswana) 2005–2010
- Andrianirainy Rasamoely (Madagascar) 2007–2012
- Justice Alfas M. Chitakunye (Zimbabwe) 2010–2015

== The secretariat ==
The secretariat of the Committee is located in Maseru, in the Kingdom of Lesotho since December 2020.

The acting Executive Secretary is Ayalew Getachew Assefa.

== The Day of the African Child ==
The Day of the African Child (DAC) was instituted in 1991 by the Assembly of Heads of State and Government of the OAU in memory of the 16th June 1976 student uprising in Soweto, South Africa. At that time, students marched protesting the poor-quality education they received and demanding to be taught in their languages. During the protest hundreds of school children were killed. The Day of the African Child is celebrated to commemorate these children and the brave action they took to defend their rights. The Day of the African Child also serves to celebrate children of Africa as well as inspire a sober reflection and action towards addressing the challenges that children in Africa face on a daily basis.

The Day of the African Child is celebrated every year on June 16 with a theme identified by the Committee based on children’s views collected from various consultations with children themselves. The Committee also developed Concept Note on the theme of the Day of the African Child to guide the commemoration of the Day in Member States of the African Union.

=== Observances ===
On June 16 of every year, the Committee, African governments, representatives of children, child and youth-led organisations, NGOs, CSOs, international organisations and other stakeholders gather to discuss the challenges and opportunities facing the full realisation of the rights of children in Africa. The Day of the African Child is celebrated at national and continental level. At national level, Member States are required to commemorate the day based on the guidance provided by the Committee through consultations with children and other stakeholders. Moreover, Member States are encouraged to take concrete action including legislative and other measures in relation to the theme of the respective year. At Continental level, the Day of the African Child is celebrated by consultations among children and training for children on the Charter followed by an inter-generational dialogue on 16 June. The Committee and the Participants of the Day of the African Child adopt an outcome statement on the theme following the Continental Celebration on 16 June.

Member States of the African Union submit report to the Committee on the national celebration of the Day of the African Child highlighting the activities of the event as well as the measures that have been undertaken concerning the theme in the commemoration of the Day of the African Child.

=== Importance ===
The Committee recognizes the importance of the Day of the African Child as an advocacy tool for enhancing the visibility of the Charter as well as promoting children’s rights and welfare in Africa. The Day of the African Child is one of the standing promotional activities of the Committee. During the celebration, The Committee promotes children’s rights and takes stock of the efforts being made to protect and promote children’s rights and welfare across the continent. The Day of the African Child thus calls for serious introspection and commitment toward addressing the numerous challenges faced by children across the continent focusing on the theme of the year.

== Violation reports: communications ==
A communication is a complaint that can be submitted before the Committee regarding an alleged violation of the African Charter on the Rights and Welfare of the Child (Charter) against a State Party. Article 44 of the African Charter on the Rights and Welfare of the Child provides that the "Committee may receive communications, from any person, group or non-governmental organization recognized by the Organization of African Unity, by a Member State, or the United Nations relating to any matter covered by this Charter." The Committee has adopted Guidelines for Consideration of Communications and Monitoring Implementation of Decisions (Guidelines) to set out the procedures and rules to be followed in dealing with Communications.

According to the article 44 of the Charter and Section I of the Guidelines, any interested person including victims, any group of persons, CSOs, intergovernmental organizations and agencies, and State Parties can submit a Communication before the Committee. A Communication could be submitted without obtaining the consent of the victims if the submission is made in the best interest of the child.

Once the Committee receives a Communication, it will conduct a preliminary review to determine whether the communication meets the form and content requirements which are set out in Section II of the Guidelines. The Committee will then consider the admissibility of the Communication based on the requirements for admissibility as provided in Section IX of the Guidelines. If a communication is declared admissible, the Committee will then consider the merits of the case which deals with the alleged violations. In the merits decision, the Committee can consider whether the State Party concerned has violated the rights in the Charter and can call for that State to remedy the situation. Where a right has been violated, the State Party concerned is required to report on the implementation of the measures being taken to implement the decisions of the Committee.

The Committee undertakes various follow-up activities to monitor the implementation of its decisions on Communications. These include, follow-up country visits, implementation hearings as provided under the Guidelines, report to the Executive Council of the African Union, among others. See Section XXII of the Guidelines for further details on implementation of decisions. The Committee has also set up a Working Group on Implementation of Decisions which is tasked to mainly to monitor the implementation of decisions of the Committee.

== State reports and concluding observations ==
State Parties to the African Charter on the Rights and Welfare of the Child are obliged to report to the African Committee of Experts on the Rights and Welfare of the Child on the status of the implementation of the provisions of the Charter in their respective countries. Pursuant to article 43 of the Charter, State Parties should submit their initial report to the Committee 2 years after ratification of the Charter and every three years thereafter. The Initial reports provide general information about the respective State as well as the legislative and institutional frameworks available for the protection of children’s rights. Moreover, initial reports highlight the measures undertaken by the State towards the realization of children’s rights under the Charter. Periodic reports highlight the measures undertaken by States on the implementation of the prior concluding observations and recommendations of the Committee in addition to efforts employed to implement the provisions of the Charter.

Upon receiving State Party reports, the Committee undertakes preliminary review of the reports after which it draws list of issues to the respective States on matters that need clarification or more information. The Committee, then, holds constructive dialogue with the Delegation of the State whose report is being considered during one of its Sessions. Consideration of State Party reports form part of the Open Sessions of the Committee whereby the discussions between the Committee and the Delegation of the State are attended by any interested person. The State Party reporting procedure is one of the key mechanisms through which the Committee continuously monitors the implementation of the Charter at a domestic level. Following the consideration of State Party reports, the Committee issues concluding observations and recommendations to the respective States where it highlights the progress achieved and further measures that should be undertaken to enhance the implementation of the Charter. The reporting cycle continues and States in their preceding reports to the Committee continue to provide information about the implementation of the recommendations of the Committee. Moreover, the Committee undertakes follow-up country visits/missions to State Parties with a view to assess the implementation of its concluding observations and recommendations and encourage States to submit their upcoming reports.

== Agenda 2040 ==
With a view of fostering an Africa Fit for Children, the Committee developed Africa’s Agenda for Children 2040 (Agenda 2040) in 2015. The development of the Agenda was inspired by a conference held in 2015 as part of the commemoration of the 25th anniversary of the African Children’s Charter to assess the situation of children in Africa in past 25 years. The Agenda emerged as an outcome of the conference but mainly as an elaboration of the bigger part of Agenda 2063 which aims at empowering African children through the full implementation of the African Children’s Charter. Agenda 2040 has been adopted by the Executive Council of the AU through its decision no EX.CL/Dec.997(XXXI) as an Africa Union document.

Agenda 2040 establishes aspirations for children for the coming 25 years based on the lessons learnt from the past 25 years. By 2040, the rights of Africa’s children should be firmly protected, with full effect being given to the priorities in this Agenda.

The Agenda sets out the following ten aspirations, to be achieved by 2040, against a brief background contextualizing the particular issue.

- Aspiration 1: The African Children’s Charter, as supervised by the African Children’s Committee, provides an effective continental framework for advancing children’s rights
- Aspiration 2: An effective child-friendly national legislative, policy and institutional framework is in place in all Member States
- Aspiration 3: Every child’s birth and other vital statistics are registered
- Aspiration 4: Every child survives and has a healthy childhood
- Aspiration 5: Every child grows up well-nourished and with access to the basic necessities of life
- Aspiration 6: Every child benefits fully from quality education
- Aspiration 7: Every child is protected against violence, exploitation, neglect and abuse
- Aspiration 8: Children benefit from a child-sensitive criminal system
- Aspiration 9: Every child is free from the impact of armed conflicts and other disasters or emergency situations
- Aspiration 10: African children’s views matter

== See also ==
- African Charter on the Rights and Welfare of the Child
