= African Capacity for Immediate Response to Crises =

- Active: 2013 – present
- Country: Algeria; Chad; South Africa; Tanzania; Uganda
- Allegiance: African Union
- Role: Infantry
- Size: 5 battalions

The African Capacity for Immediate Response to Crises (ACIRC) is a temporary multinational African interventionist standby force set up in November 2013. It will be replaced by the African Standby Force when it becomes fully operational.
