= Pediatric Symptom Checklist =

35-item parent-report questionnaire

- Purpose: identifies children with psychosocial functioning difficulties

The Pediatric Symptom Checklist (PSC) is a 35-item parent-report questionnaire designed to identify children with difficulties in psychosocial functioning. Its primary purpose is to alert pediatricians at an early point about which children would benefit from further assessment. A positive result on the overall scale indicates that the child in question would benefit from further evaluation. It is not a diagnostic tool. The PSC has subscales which measure inner distress and mood, interpersonal relations and behavior, and attention. The PSC is also used in pediatrics and other settings to measure changes in psychosocial functioning over time. Michael Jellinek, MD, created the PSC and has researched it over more than thirty years in collaboration with J. Michael Murphy, Ed.D. and other investigators. The PSC has been used in more than 200 studies in the US and other countries and has been endorsed by the American Academy of Pediatrics, the state of Massachusetts, the government of Chile and many other organizations.

== Development and structure ==
The PSC was designed because none of the available instruments offered the "optimal combination of efficiency, ease of administration, and screening accuracy" (p. 451). The first draft was a shortened and revised form of the Washington Symptom Checklist (WSCL) designed by Weinberger and Gregory. The researchers shortened the WSCL from 67 to 27 questions and removed open-ended questions. They also revised questions to address the five major areas they wanted to examine: mood, play, school, friends, and family relations. The PSC was further revised based on "the symptoms of the major diagnoses for children listed in the American Psychiatric Association DSM-III, the clinical impressions of several pediatricians, psychologists, and child psychiatrists, and a review of items from other questionnaires reported to be the most useful in identifying children with emotional problems" (p. 372).

The current PSC contains 35 statements focused on the child's day-to-day behavior and mood. Parents are asked to indicate how frequently each of the statements, referred to as symptoms, describes the child; response options include "never", "sometimes", and "often". Examples of statements include "feels he or she is bad", "teases others", and "is distracted easily". The questionnaire takes 3–5 minutes to complete. The original study of the PSC focused on children between 6 and 12 years old, but the checklist has been studied and validated in all age groups between 4 and 16 years.

== Scoring and interpretation ==
The PSC is scored by assigning point values to the ratings: 2 = “often”, 1 = “sometimes”, and 0 = “never”. The points are summed for a total score, with possible scores ranging from 0 to 70. An overall score above the cutoff point, sometimes referred to as a positive score, indicates need for further assessment. The cutoff score for children older than 6 years old is 28. For children younger than 6 years old, four items that pertain to school are excluded. As a result, the range of scores is lower and the cutoff score is lowered to 24.

If a child obtains a score above the cutoff, the pediatrician would review the questionnaire, explore any apparent problem areas, determine the severity of dysfunction, and then decide on what type of follow-up is appropriate: no follow-up needed, treatment already being received, follow-up by pediatrician, or referral to a mental health professional.

== Versions ==
There are four versions of the PSC, including a full-length parent-report form (PSC), a full-length youth self-report form (Y-PSC), a shortened parent-report form (PSC-17), and a shortened youth self-report form (Y-PSC-17).

=== Y-PSC ===
The Y-PSC was designed to screen adolescents for psychosocial problems in school settings. It was adapted from the PSC by changing relevant pronouns and verbs. For instance, the statement “takes things that do not belong to him or her” was changed to “take things that do not belong to you” and the statement “worries a lot” was changed to “worry a lot”. The recommended cutoff score is 30 and it has the same number of items as the PSC. As a self-report measure, it is useful for identifying symptoms of internalizing disorders, such as anxiety or depression, which are often missed by parents.

=== PSC-17 ===
The PSC-17 is a shortened, 17-item version of the PSC. It also includes three sub-scales which were designed to screen for distinct domains of psychosocial problems — internalizing, externalizing, and attention — and provide physicians with more information about directions for further evaluation. The subscales were also intended to increase the sensitivity of the screen because only using a total score might miss children with dysfunction in only one domain. Internalizing problems involve inner distress and mood and questions about these problems include the statements “feels hopeless” and “is down on him or herself.” Externalizing problems typically involve maladaptive behaviors and conflicts with others; questions about externalizing problems include the statements “fights with other children” and “teases others.” Questions about attention problems include the statements “fidgety, unable to sit still” and “distracted easily.” Parents respond to statements with ratings on the same scale as the PSC: often, sometimes, or never .

Parents ratings are converted to a total score and sub-scale scores. The cut-offs for the total score, internalizing problems scale, externalizing problems scale, and attention problems scale are 15, 5, 7, and 7, respectively. As on the PSC, a score above the cutoff is not diagnostic; it indicates only that further evaluation is needed.

=== Y-PSC-17 ===
The Y-PSC-17 was adapted from the PSC-17 for self-report by adolescents. It has not yet been validated.

== Psychometrics ==
=== Reliability ===
==== Test-retest ====
Studies of the PSC have consistently found moderate to high test-retest reliability. An early study of the PSC compared scores one week apart and found Pearson's r = 0.86. The original study of the Y-PSC retested participants four months after the original test and found r = 0.45. PSC scores were examined over a longer period of time, 10 to 18 months, in a more recent study which found that scores for patients who originally scored negative, below the cutoff, were stable over time and the scores of patients who originally scored positive, above the cutoff, and were referred to mental health services tended to decrease, or improve.

==== Internal consistency ====
Internal consistency has routinely been high in studies of the PSC and its various forms, formats, and languages. The original study of the PSC found alpha = 0.86 indicating that the PSC had a fairly high degree of internal consistency. One of the original studies of the PSC-17 measured internal consistency of the full scale and each of its subscales and found alpha values for each between 0.79 and 0.89. A study using the English, Spanish, oral, and written formats of the PSC found alpha = 0.91–0.92 for all formats. A study done with the Dutch PSC found alpha = 0.89, one done with the German PSC found alpha = 0.86, for the Korean PSC alpha = 0.95.

=== Validity ===
==== Concurrent ====
The PSC has consistently shown moderate to strong correlations with other validated measures of similar constructs, demonstrating concurrent validity. The original study compared checklist scores to ratings derived from a psychiatric interview and found r = 0.85. An early study of the PSC compared it with the Child Behavior Checklist (CBCL) developed by Achenbach and found kappa = 0.76 indicating a high level of agreement. The original study of the PSC-17 compared its subscales to other validated parent report instruments and found good agreement. The internalizing subscale was compared to the Screen for Child Anxiety Related Emotional Disorders (SCARED), the externalizing subscale was compared to the aggression subscale of the Iowa Connors Rating Scale, and the attention subscale was compared to the inattention—overactivity subscale of the Iowa Connors Rating scale. A study comparing the PSC-17 total score to the CBCL found r = 0.72.

==== Predictive ====
Demonstrating predictive validity, a positive score on the Y-PSC was correlated with specific psychosocial problem areas including getting into trouble, health problems, and problems getting along with parents and peers in a study of adolescents. Students with positive scores on the Y-PSC were also more likely to have poor grades and have higher absentee and tardy rates.

== Impact ==
Psychosocial dysfunction is a common condition of children and adolescents and the risk for impairment seems to be higher for at risk groups such as minority or low-income families. Routine use of screening instruments, like the PSC, in primary care is a means of improving recognition and management of dysfunction. To further increase detection of psychosocial problems, the PSC can be used during acute care visits; only using the PSC during routine, health check-ups may miss opportunities to recognize dysfunction and refer patients to further mental health assessment and care. Studies have shown that referral to mental health services can lead to improved academic performance and that recognizing and managing psychosocial problems is “one of the best ways to prevent delinquency, violence, and other high-risk behaviors.” The PSC can also be used to track outcomes of treatment as successful interventions have been found to reduce scores over time.

Studies have also found that the PSC is useful as a screening measure to meet federal Medicaid/Early and Periodic Screening, Diagnosis, and Treatment (EPSDT) requirements for children ages 4 –16.

== Use in other populations ==
The PSC has been translated into 19 other languages including Spanish, Chinese, Dutch, French, German, and Japanese. A pictorial version of the PSC has also been developed. The Y-PSC, PSC-17, and Y-PSC-17 have been translated into 5, 3, and 1 other language, respectively.

The Spanish PSC, along with the English PSC, in both oral and written formats was used in a study with Mexican-American pre-school children, aged 4–5. All forms were found to be valid and reliable. However, when the age range was expanded to 4–16 years in a later study, the cut-off score had to be lowered to 12 to optimize sensitivity. A study done with the Dutch PSC found it to have good internal consistency and validity. Dutch children's mean PSC scores, as well as scores on other symptom checklists, were lower than those of American children indicating differences in levels of symptoms reported by parents based on country. A lower cut-off score of 22 had to be adopted to reach a similar level of sensitivity and specificity to the US version. The German translation of the PSC was used in a study of Austrian preschool children and found to be valid and reliable. The mean PSC scores were low; a lower cut-off score of 15.5 was adopted to optimize sensitivity and specificity. A study of the Korean PSC found it to have good reliability and validity. The cut-off score was lowered to 14 to achieve optimal sensitivity and specificity.

Studies have examined the use of the PSC and PSC-17 in urban or inner-city populations. The PSC was found to be valid and reliable for children in these areas. The study of the PSC-17 found that the sub-scales, particularly the externalizing and attention sub-scales, may not be valid measures in urban populations.

== Limitations ==
=== PSC and PSC-17 ===
The PSC and PSC-17, as parent-report measures, have some limitations: parents may not recognize or acknowledge their children's problems, especially if they have weak parent-child connections, and may under- or over-report their symptoms.

Studies of different translations of the PSC in different countries have found that the recommended cut-off score is not always optimal for detection of children with impairments. Having to recalculate the cut-off for each new language or population could make it difficult to use.

=== Y-PSC ===
As a self-report measure for children and adolescents, the Y-PSC is subject to some limitations: respondents may misunderstand questions, especially those with learning or attentional problems, and children may under- or over-report their symptoms.

== See also ==
- Diagnostic classification and rating scales used in psychiatry
