= Social Christian Party (Bolivia) =

Political party

The Social Christian Party (Spanish: Partido Social Cristiano, PSC) was a progressive Christian-democratic political party in Bolivia.

In 1978 the pro-military group split from the Christian Democratic Party and founded the Social Christian Party. Led by Jaime Humérez Seleme, Alfonso Prudencio Claure, and Adolfo Palma Caro.

In 1978 the Social Christian Party took part in an electoral coalition Nationalist Union of the People backing Juan Pereda Asbún.

After the coup d'état on 17 July 1980 the Social Christian Party disappeared.
