= African Peace and Security Architecture =

Policy framework of the African Union

The African Peace and Security Architecture (APSA) includes the three central instruments conflict prevention, conflict management and peace building of the African Union (AU), the Regional Economic Communities (RECs) as well as the Regional Mechanism (RMs).

== Background ==
The APSA evolved in the late 1990s, when the African continent was confronted with severe crises such as the civil war in Somalia, which was ongoing since 1991, and the genocide in Rwanda 1994. At the same time, the statutes of the Organisation of African Unity (OAU) did not allow an intervention in the inner affairs of another state. In order to be able to intervene in situations of severe human rights violations, the member states of the OAU decided to establish the African Union (AU) in 2002. Two years later, the decision to establish the APSA was taken. The signature of the constitutive act of the AU marked a turning point of inner-African relations. Article 4 (h) and (j) of the constitutive act allows AU member states to intervene in a third state even against the will of the respective government in case of crimes against humanity, such as war crimes and genocide. Therefore, the AU constitutive act is the first treaty under international law, which includes the right to militarily intervene in a third state based on humanitarian reasons, which is today often called a humanitarian intervention. This normative shift increased when the founding protocol of the Peace and Security Council (PSC) of the AU came into effect December 26, 2003. The protocol defines a broad agenda for peace and security, including central elements such as conflict prevention, early warning, preventive diplomacy, conflict management, peacemaking and peacebuilding as well as support for and development of democratic policies, humanitarian actions and conflict management. Consequently, the PSC founding protocol can be seen as the basis for the APSA. It is the aim of the APSA to provide the AU, the RECs and the RMs with all the instruments necessary to fulfil the tasks and mandate relating from the constitutive act of the AU and the founding protocol of the PSC.

== Structure ==
The structure of the APSA is based on the protocol relating to the establishment of the Peace and Security Council of the African Union (PSC Protocol, 2002). Article 2 names the following five pillars of the APSA, including institutions and decision-making processes: -the Peace and Security Council (PSC), which is the central organ of the AU -the Panel of the Wise (PoW) -the Continental Early Warning System (CEWS) -the African Standby Force (ASF) -the Peace Fund

The AU claims that its mandate in the area of peace and security is valid for the whole African continent. In addition to this, several Regional Economic Communities (RECs) and Regional Mechanisms (RMs) are part of the APSA. The cooperation between the RECs and the AU is guided by the principles of subsidiarity, of complementarity and of the comparative advantages. The operationalisation of the APSA Instruments was intended to be finished until the end of 2015. However, the status of the instruments varies strongly depending on the individual instruments and organisation.

== International Support ==
The APSA is strongly dependent on external sources financially. In 2015, 95% of the total AU budget was financed by external partners (EU, EU member states, Japan and China). In 2016, external financing was estimated to amount to 52% of the budget; however, the detailed budget plan is not known yet.

== See also ==
- African Union
- Peace and Security Council
- Arab Maghreb Union
- Economic Community of West African States
- Economic Community of Central African States
- East African Community
- Southern African Development Community

== Literature ==
- Ulf Engel, João Gomes Porto (Ed.): Africa's New Peace and Security Architecture. Promoting Norms, Institutionalizing Solutions. Ashgate, Farnham 2010.
- Ulf Engel, João Gomes Porto (Ed.): Towards an African Peace and Security Regime. Ashgate, Farnham 2013.
- European Union (Ed.): The African Peace and Security Architecture: Still under construction. Brüssel 2014.
- Friedrich-Ebert-Stiftung (Hrsg.): The African Peace and Security Architecture. A Handbook. Addis Abeba 2014.
