= Peace and Security Council =

African Union's security council

The Peace and Security Council (PSC) is the organ of the African Union in charge of enforcing union decisions. It is patterned somewhat after the United Nations Security Council. The PSC is also the main pillar of the African Peace and Security Architecture (APSA), and works with other pillars of the APSA in order to promote "peace, security and stability in Africa". The specific goal of the Peace and Security Council (PSC) is the "prevention, management and resolution of conflicts". To achieve these goals, it involves subsidiary organizations such as the Military Staff Committee and the Committee of Experts.

Members are elected by the African Union Executive Council and endorsed by the Assembly of the African Union so as to reflect regional balance within Africa, as well as a variety of other criteria, including capacity to contribute militarily and financially to the union, political will to do so, and effective diplomatic presence at Addis Ababa.

The council is composed of fifteen countries, of which five are elected to three-year terms, and ten to two-year terms. Countries are immediately re-eligible upon the expiration of their terms.

== History ==
=== Background ===
In the early 1990s, members of the Organization of African Unity (OAU), the predecessor to the African Union (AU), decided to abstain from active peacekeeping operations and focus instead on "preventive diplomacy". However, they reevaluated their stances after conflicts in Rwanda and Burundi.

In 1995, members of the OAU started to support the use of peacekeeping operations after a summit in Addis Ababa. However, the OAU still prioritized preventive diplomacy and believed that the United Nations should shoulder most of the responsibility for organizing peacekeeping operations.

Later conflicts in Africa were largely mediated by African institutions rather than the UN. For example, conflicts in Liberia and Sierra Leone were addressed by the Economic Community of West African States. Similarly, conflicts in Lesotho and the Democratic Republic of Congo were addressed by the Southern African Development Community.

These sub-regional organizations' large role in addressing regional conflicts led to a debate about the effectiveness of the OAU. Members specifically wished to reform the OAU's focus on consensus-based meetings rather than on-the-ground action, since some conflicts' actors were part of the meetings and could interfere with their judgement. Similarly, the large size of the OAU, its consensus decision-making and its lack of clear procedures both obstructed constructive debate. However, on-the-ground interventions were also limited by the OAU's non-interventionist principles, which only allowed domestic military intervention with the state's consent.

Thus, in 2001, an OAU Assembly session moved to reform the OAU's mechanisms in a new institution: the African Union. The new African Union was designed to center around a central decision-making organ with concrete rules, a smaller membership of 15 states to facilitate decision-making, majority rather than consensus-based decision-making, and viable options to recommend military intervention to the African Union Assembly. After some debate, this decision-making organ was coined the Peace and Security Council, and its rules were outlined in the Protocol Relating to the Establishment of the Peace and Security Council.

=== Protocol Relating to the Establishment of the Peace and Security Council ===
Adopted in July 2002, the Protocol was later ratified by a majority of AU members in December 2003. Within the Protocol's text, the institutional design, subsidiary committees, powers and goals of the PSC were outlined.

Specifically, its Objectives were stated in Article 3, and its Principles were stated in Article 4. When outlining its Principles, the Protocol cites three inspirations: "the [AU's] Constitutive Act, the Charter of the United Nations and the Universal Declaration of Human Rights".

In Article 5, the Protocol details the PSC's membership structure and membership criteria.

Article 8 outlines the PSC's procedural rules, including rules for voting, organizing meetings and creating subsidiary bodies.

Specific subcommittees that support the PSC, such as the Panel of the Wise, the Continental Early Warning System, and the African Standby Force are detailed in Articles 11, 12 and 13, respectively.

Finally, the Protocol outlines the PSC's relationship with regional bodies in Article 16, and relationship with international organizations, especially the UN, in Article 17.

== Organization ==
=== Meetings ===
There are three levels of PSC meetings: meetings between permanent representatives, meetings between ministers, and meetings between heads of state. Permanent representative meetings meet at least twice a month, whereas the other two levels meet at least once per year.

Until 2007, there were three types of meetings: formal meetings, briefing sessions and consultations. In formal meetings, members discuss AU Commission reports, which often concern brewing conflicts. In briefing sessions, PSC staff briefs members on various subject areas and themes, such as terrorism and development. In consultation meetings, PSC members work to gather various actors and develop an understanding of a certain issue.

After a brainstorming session in July 2007, the PSC instead chose to meet under four types of meetings: public meetings, closed meetings, consultations and "Arria-type" meetings. In "Arria-type" meetings, PSC members meet with non-state actors and carry out informal discussions.

As of 2016, the PSC has held over 600 meetings.

=== Chairperson of the Commission ===
Every month, a new chairperson is selected from the PSC members. This selection cycles through the alphabetical order of the PSC's member country names, in English.

=== Members ===
Although the PSC was partly inspired by the United Nations Security Council, unlike the UNSC, the PSC does not have any permanent members or veto power. All 15 members have equal power in the council. Ten members are elected for two years and five members are elected for three years. Members are elected to represent Africa's regional distribution. In order, each potential member must meet certain criteria. These criteria are outlined in Article five of the Protocol Relating to the Establishment of the Peace and Security Council..

Each term starts from the date of the 1st of April and ends on the date of the 31st of March. As of April 2020, the following countries occupy the seats of the PSC:

Morocco, a member of the Peace and Security Council of the African Union, assumed the presidency of this important executive body for a three-year term (2022–2025) starting from the first of February 2024. This council is dedicated to promoting peace, security, and stability on the African continent.

Term	Central Africa			Eastern Africa			Northern Africa		Southern Africa			Western Africa			
Length	3 yr	2 yr		3 yr	2 yr		3 yr	2 yr	3 yr	2 yr		3 yr	2 yr		
1 April 2016	Congo-Brazzaville	Chad	Burundi	Kenya	Rwanda	Uganda	Egypt	Algeria	Zambia	South Africa	Botswana	Nigeria	Niger	Sierra Leone	Senegal
2017	Congo-Brazzaville	Chad	Burundi	Kenya	Rwanda	Uganda	Egypt	Algeria	Zambia	South Africa	Botswana	Nigeria	Niger	Sierra Leone	Senegal
2018	Congo-Brazzaville	Equatorial Guinea	Gabon	Kenya	Rwanda	Djibouti	Egypt	Morocco	Zambia	Angola	Zimbabwe	Nigeria	Liberia	Sierra Leone	Togo
2019	Burundi	Equatorial Guinea	Gabon	Kenya	Rwanda	Djibouti	Algeria	Morocco	Lesotho	Angola	Zimbabwe	Nigeria	Liberia	Sierra Leone	Togo
2020	Burundi	Cameroon	Chad	Kenya	Ethiopia	Djibouti	Algeria	Egypt	Lesotho	Malawi	Mozambique	Nigeria	Benin	Ghana	Senegal
2021	Burundi	Cameroon	Chad	Kenya	Ethiopia	Djibouti	Algeria	Egypt	Lesotho	Malawi	Mozambique	Nigeria	Benin	Ghana	Senegal
2022	Cameroon	Congo-Brazzaville	Burundi	Djibouti	Tanzania	Uganda	Morocco	Tunisia	Namibia	South Africa	Zimbabwe	Nigeria	Gambia	Ghana	Senegal
2023	Cameroon	Congo-Brazzaville	Burundi	Djibouti	Tanzania	Uganda	Morocco	Tunisia	Namibia	South Africa	Zimbabwe	Nigeria	Gambia	Ghana	Senegal
2024	Cameroon	Congo-Kinshasa	Equatorial Guinea	Djibouti	Tanzania	Uganda	Morocco	Egypt	Namibia	Angola	Botswana	Nigeria	Gambia	Ivory Coast	Sierra Leone
2025	Cameroon	Congo-Kinshasa	Equatorial Guinea	Ethiopia	Tanzania	Uganda	Algeria	Egypt	Eswatini	Angola	Botswana	Nigeria	Gambia	Ivory Coast	Sierra Leone
2026	Cameroon	Congo-Kinshasa	Gabon	Ethiopia	Somalia	Uganda	Algeria	Morocco	Eswatini	Lesotho	South Africa	Nigeria	Benin	Ivory Coast	Sierra Leone
2027	Cameroon	Congo-Kinshasa	Gabon	Ethiopia	Somalia	Uganda	Algeria	Morocco	Eswatini	Lesotho	South Africa	Nigeria	Benin	Ivory Coast	Sierra Leone

== Role ==
=== Mission ===
The mission of the PSC is to respond to conflicts in Africa. The PSC relies on collective security and its early warning detection systems. Article 3 of the Relating to the Establishment of the Peace and Security Council expands upon the PSC's objectives.

=== Powers ===
Article 7 of the Protocol Relating to the Establishment of the Peace and Security Council lists the PSC's power.

Some of these powers include undertaking "peace-making and peace-building functions to resolve conflicts", recommending intervention to the AU Assembly in "grave circumstances, namely war crimes, genocide and crimes against humanity", promoting a close relationship with regional bodies as well as with the United Nations, facilitating humanitarian action and finally, deciding "on any other issue having implications for the maintenance of peace, security and stability on the Continent".

=== Peace support missions ===
Ribbon bar of the African Union Medals for peace support missions.

The following peace support operations have been conducted under an AU mandate, or with AU authorisation:

- African Union Mission in Burundi (AMIB) – 2003 to 2004
  AU mandated 2 April 2003 (for a period of 12 months); deployed 27 April 2003 to 31 May 2004 when the mission was succeeded by a UN mission. The Head of Mission and Special Representative of the Chairperson of the AU Commission was Ambassador Mamadou Bah (Guinea). The Force Commander of AMIB's military component was Major-General Sipho Binda (South Africa), while his deputy, Brigadier-General G. Ayele, was from Ethiopia.
- African Union Mission in Sudan (AMIS) – 2004 to 2007
- African Union Military Observer Mission in the Comoros (MIOC) - 2004
- African Union Mission for Support to the Elections in Comoros (AMISEC) – 2006
- African Union Mission in Somalia (AMISOM) – 2007 to present
  On 20 February 2007 the UN Security Council adopted SC Resolution 1744, which authorised AMISOM's deployment.
- African Union Electoral and Security Assistance Mission to the Comoros (MAES) – 2007 to 2008
- African Union/ United Nations Hybrid Mission (UNAMID) - 2008 to present
  On 31 July 2007 UN Security Council Resolution 1769 (UNSC 2007) established the AU/ UN Hybrid Operation in Darfur, also referred to as UNAMID.
- Regional Cooperation Initiative for the Elimination of the Lord's Resistance Army (RCI-LRA) – 2011 to 2017
  Authorised by the AU Peace and Security Council in November 2011.
- African-led International Support Mission to Mali (AFISMA) – 2013
- African-led Support Mission to the Central African Republic (MISCA) – 2013 to 2014
  A regional peace support mission - the Mission for the consolidation of peace in Central African Republic (MICOPAX) - was deployed in 2008 under the leadership of the Economic Community of Central African States (ECCAS). But a new crisis erupted in 2012–2013, when Séléka forces seized the capital Bangui. In response, on 19 July 2013, the AU Peace and Security Council approved the deployment of MISCA. The transfer of authority between ECCAS/MICOPAX and the AU/MISCA mission took place on 19 December 2013. The mission ended with the transfer of authority from MISCA to the UN mission MINUSCA on 15 September 2014.
- Multinational Joint Task Force (MNJTF) – 2015 to present
- Regional Protection Force – 2017 to present
  During July 2016 the AU agreed to a Regional Protection Force to bolster the UN mission in South Sudan, similar to the United Nations Force Intervention Brigade role with the MONUSCO mission in the Democratic Republic of the Congo UN Security Council resolution 2304 adopted on 12 August 2016 approved the deployment of a Regional Protection Force to the UN Mission in South Sudan to provide a secure environment in and around Juba. Rwandan troops deployed during 2017 as part of the proposed force, but there has been little subsequent news of this force and it appears it may have been merely absorbed into the larger UN mission. It included a Bangladeshi engineer company and a Nepalese company in addition to a Rwandan mechanised infantry battalion, so cannot be said to be an African force.

The following operations were authorized but never resulted in deployment:

- During December 2015 the PSC authorised a force of up to 5000 troops to be deployed to Burundi for six months to help restore order following an outbreak of politically inspired violence. However, the African Prevention and Protection Mission in Burundi (MAPROBU) was not welcomed by the Government of Burundi and never deployed to the troubled country.

== Criticism ==
Some AU members criticized the PSC Protocol for being vague on which institution has the "primary legal authority" to use military force; in Article 16, the PSC Protocol states that the AU has "the primary responsibility for promoting peace, security and stability in Africa" whereas in Article 17, the Protocol states that the UN Security Council "has the primary responsibility for the maintenance of international peace and security".

Ben Kioko, the African Union's legal adviser, argued that "[some African] leaders have shown themselves willing to push the frontiers of collective stability and security to the limit without any regard for legal niceties such as the authorization of the [United Nations] Security Council".

Later in 2005, African Union members acknowledged the Security Council's authority on military use, as demonstrated in a meeting roadmap which promised that the AU would first get Security Council authorization before carrying out military interventions.

Some officials within the PSC have also argued that the PSC should broaden its scope beyond traditional military threats to security, and also address nontraditional threats such as disease and climate change.

Conversely, others question the political will of PSC and AU members to follow the PSC protocol and carry out military interventions against other members without their consent in cases of mass human rights abuses. Furthermore, the PSC relies on regional bodies contributing funds or troops for operations, but many regional bodies do not have enough resources to meet these standards.

When electing members into the PSC itself, critics have noted that members who were actively disobeying AU decisions or carrying out human rights violations within their borders have still been admitted into the Council because the Assembly of the African Union Heads of State did not properly evaluate the potential members' compliance to the PSC membership criteria.

== Bibliography ==
- Aboagye, Festus (January 2004). "The African Mission in Burundi: Lessons learned from the first African Union peacekeeping operation". Conflict Trends (2): 9–15. hdl:10520/EJC15836.
- Boutellis, Arthur; Williams, Paul D. (23 April 2013). "Peace Operations, the African Union and the United Nations: Toward More Effective Partnerships in Peace Operations". New York: International Peace Institute.
- Maru, Mehari Taddele (14 February 2013). "African-Led International Support Mission in Mali (AFISMA): Military ahead of Politics" (PDF). Al Jazeera Centre for Studies.
- Murithi, Tim (September 2007). "The responsibility to protect, as enshrined in article 4 of the Constitutive Act of the African Union". African Security Review. 16 (3): 14–24. doi:10.1080/10246029.2007.9627428. S2CID 143571654.
- Murithi, Tim (March 2008). "The African Union's evolving role in peace operations: the African Union Mission in Burundi, the African Union Mission in Sudan and the African Union Mission in Somalia" (PDF). African Security Review. 17 (1): 69–82. doi:10.1080/10246029.2008.9627460. S2CID 144103501.
- Williams, Paul D. (31 July 2013). "Peace Operations in Africa: Lessons Learned Since 2000". Africa Security Brief (25). Africa Center for Strategic Studies.
- Williams, Paul D. (May 2015). Enhancing U.S. Support for Peace Operations in Africa (Special Report). New York: Council on Foreign Relations Press. ISBN 978-0-87609-624-6.
- African Politics, African Peace. World Peace Foundation. July 2016. ISBN 978-0-9801452-4-3.
