= PUV =

PUV may refer to:

- Posterior urethral valve (PUV)
- Pulau virus (PuV)
- Public utility vehicle (PUV) for public transportation in the Philippines
- Publivoo (ICAO airline code PUV), see List of airline codes (P)
- Malabou Airport (IATA airport code PUV), Poum, Malabou, New Caledonia; see List of airports in New Caledonia

== See also ==
- PVU (disambiguation)
- puu (disambiguation)
- PVV (disambiguation)
- PW (disambiguation)
