= PVV =

PVV may refer to:

- Party for Freedom (Dutch: Partij voor de Vrijheid), a political party in the Netherlands
- Party for Freedom and Progress (PVV-PLP; Dutch: PVV (Partij voor Vrijheid en Vooruitgang), French: PLP), a Belgian political party 1961–1992
- Politie Voetbal Vrienden, a Surinamese football club
- Fly Pro, a Moldovan cargo airline, ICAO airline code PVV
- Continental Airways, a defunct Russian airline, ICAO airline code PVV
- PIN Verification Value, used to verify a card personal identification number
- Potato virus V, a plant pathogenic virus

== See also ==
- PV (disambiguation)
- PV2 (disambiguation)
- P2V (disambiguation)
- PW (disambiguation)
