= PVU =

PVU may refer to:

- Paradox Valley Unit, a pumping facility in the Paradox Valley in Colorado
- Paravur Railway Station, a railway station in Kollam, India
- PetroVietnam University, a university in Vietnam
- Porter Value Unit, a unit to measure proanthocyanidin content of a sample
- Potato virus U, a pathogenic plant virus discovered in Peru in 1983
- Potential vorticity unit, a unit in meteorology
- Provo Municipal Airport (IATA: PVU), Utah

== See also ==
- PUV (disambiguation)
