= Taxis of the Philippines =

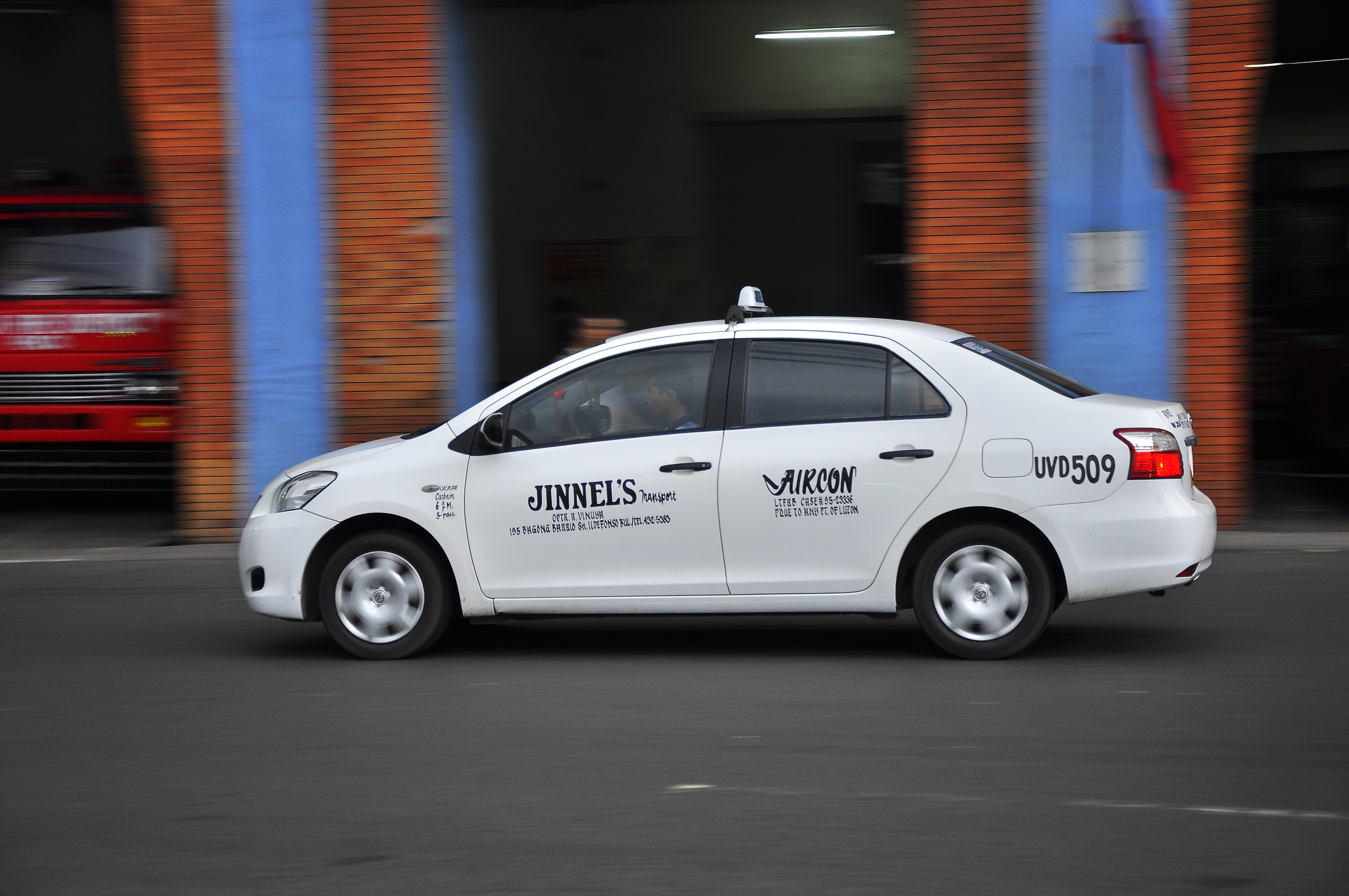
A Toyota Vios white taxicab roaming in Metro Manila.

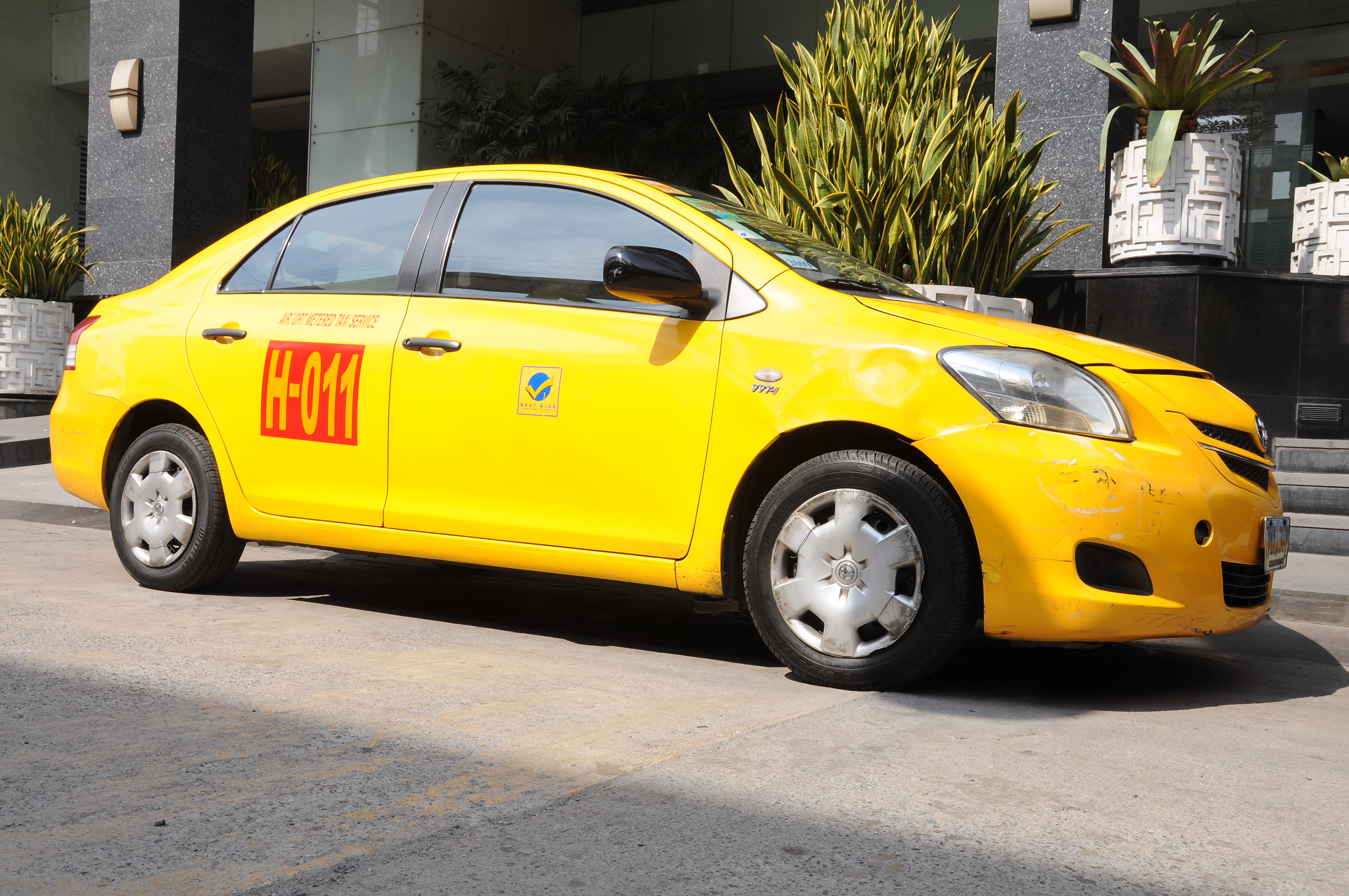
A yellow Toyota Vios airport taxicab

Taxicabs of the Philippines are one of the modes of transportation in the country. They are regulated by the Department of Transportation (DOTr), the Land Transportation Office (LTO), and the Land Transportation Franchising and Regulatory Board (LTFRB). The taxicabs there vary from models and uses. Most taxicabs have yellow colored license plates, taxi signs, LTFRB Registration number, and taximeter, which is mandatory in every cab.

Taxicabs in the Philippines are usually white while yellow is commonly used as airport taxis. In metropolitan Manila, some cab companies use different colour configurations to help distinguish their cars from other companies such as blue, grey, and red.

Taxis during the 1990s did not have a color-coding system but in 2001, LTFRB mandated that all taxicabs should be white. Some taxicab companies, however, still use their own colors to distinguish their units while keeping the roof and pillars white. Airport taxis, on the other hand, are yellow. A taxicab has a maximum operational lifespan of 10 years before being pulled out of service.

Each taxicab has its license plate number printed on both quarter panels. The rear of the car has the telephone numbers of the taxicab company and the LTFRB printed to report any reckless driving.

== Availability ==
Most of Metropolitan Areas in the Philippines have taxicabs to serve. The franchises of taxicabs are under the policy of LTFRB and Local Government units around the country. Here is the list of areas where taxicabs are available:

- Luzon
  - Metro Manila
    - Yellow Taxicabs - from airport to any part of Luzon
    - White Taxicabs - any part of Metro Manila and neighbor Provinces
  - Cavite
  - Baguio
  - Batangas City
  - Bulacan
  - Laoag, Ilocos Norte
  - Vigan, Ilocos Sur
  - San Fernando, La Union
  - Dagupan, Pangasinan
  - Tuguegarao, Cagayan
  - Clark Freeport Zone
  - Subic Bay Freeport Zone
  - City of Naga, Camarines Sur (in the Bicol Region)
  - Legazpi City, Albay
  - Puerto Princesa, Palawan
  - Rizal
  - Lucena City, Quezon
  - Angeles City, Pampanga
- Visayas
  - Tacloban, Leyte
  - Ormoc City
  - Cebu City
  - Mandaue City, Cebu
  - Lapu-Lapu City
  - Bohol
  - Iloilo City
  - Bacolod
  - Talisay, Cebu
- Mindanao
  - Butuan
  - Cagayan de Oro
  - Davao City
  - General Santos
  - Iligan
  - Zamboanga City
  - Cotabato City

== Fleet ==
List of vehicles that have been used as Taxicabs:

  - Nissan Sentra
  - Toyota Vios (Base, J, E, and XLE variants only)
  - Toyota Corolla (E100) (XL variant only)
  - Toyota Corolla (E110) (XL variant only)
  - Toyota Corolla (E120)/Toyota Corolla Altis (J variant only)
  - Toyota Corolla (E140)/Toyota Corolla Altis (J variant only)
  - Mitsubishi Lancer
  - Mitsubishi Mirage G4 (GLX variant only)
  - Kia Rio
  - Kia Pride
  - Kia Avella
  - Nissan Almera
  - Toyota Tamaraw FX/Toyota Revo
  - Isuzu Crosswind (XT, XL, and XS variants only)
  - Isuzu Gemini
  - Isuzu Hi-Lander
  - Suzuki Dzire (GL variant only)
  - Hyundai Accent
  - Hyundai Elantra
  - Hyundai Excel
  - Hyundai Reina
  - Kia Soluto (EX variant only)
  - Mitsubishi Adventure (GX and GLX variants only)
  - Toyota Innova (J variant only)
  - Toyota Avanza (J variant only)
  - MG 5 (Core variant only)
  - Mitsubishi Xpander (GLX variant only)

== See also ==
- Automotive industry in the Philippines
- Transportation in the Philippines
- List of bus companies of the Philippines
