= Puu =

Puu or Pu'u is a Hawaiian word for any protuberance, from a pimple to a hill, and can refer to:

- Puu Kukui, mountain peak in Hawaii
- Pu'u Huluhulu (Hawaii Route 200)
- Puʻu ʻŌʻō (Puu Oo), volcanic cone in Hawaii
- Setsuna Meioh (Sailor Pluto), Sailor Moon character
- Puu (YuYu Hakusho), a major secondary character from Yu Yu Hakusho
