= PV2 =

PV2 may refer to:

- Perivitellin-2, a neurotoxin found in apple snail eggs
- PV2, a Private rank in the United States Army

== See also ==
- P2V (disambiguation)
