= Transportation in the Philippines =

Transportation networks and infrastructure in Philippines

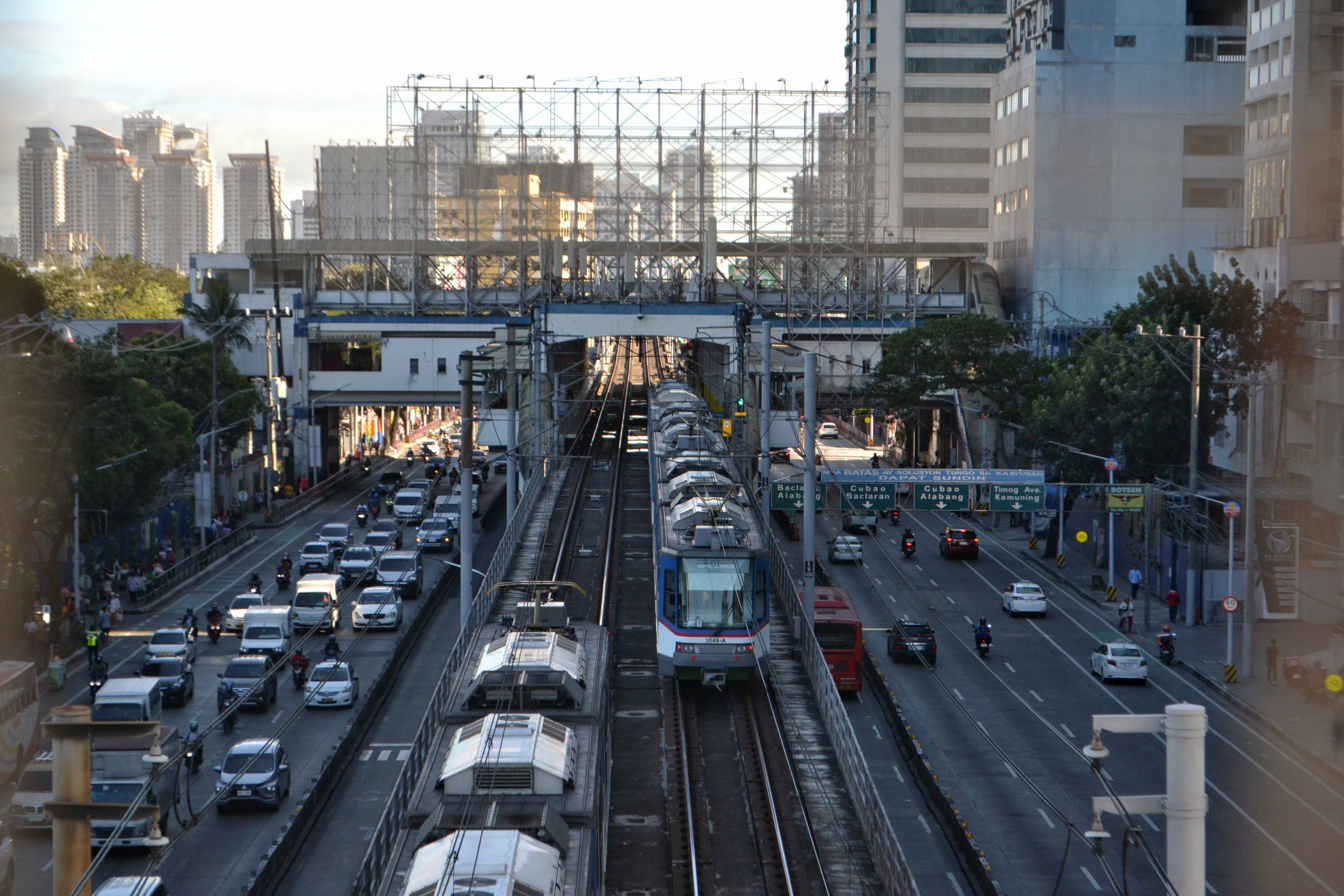
The MRT Line 3, and EDSA Carousel alongside Epifanio de los Santos Avenue in 2024.

Transportation in the Philippines covers the transportation methods within the archipelagic nation of over 7,600 islands. From a previously underdeveloped state of transportation, the government of the Philippines has been improving transportation through various direct infrastructure projects, and these include an increase in air, sea, road, and rail transportation and transport hubs. However, relative to the size of population and level of income, public transportation remains underdeveloped in the Philippines.

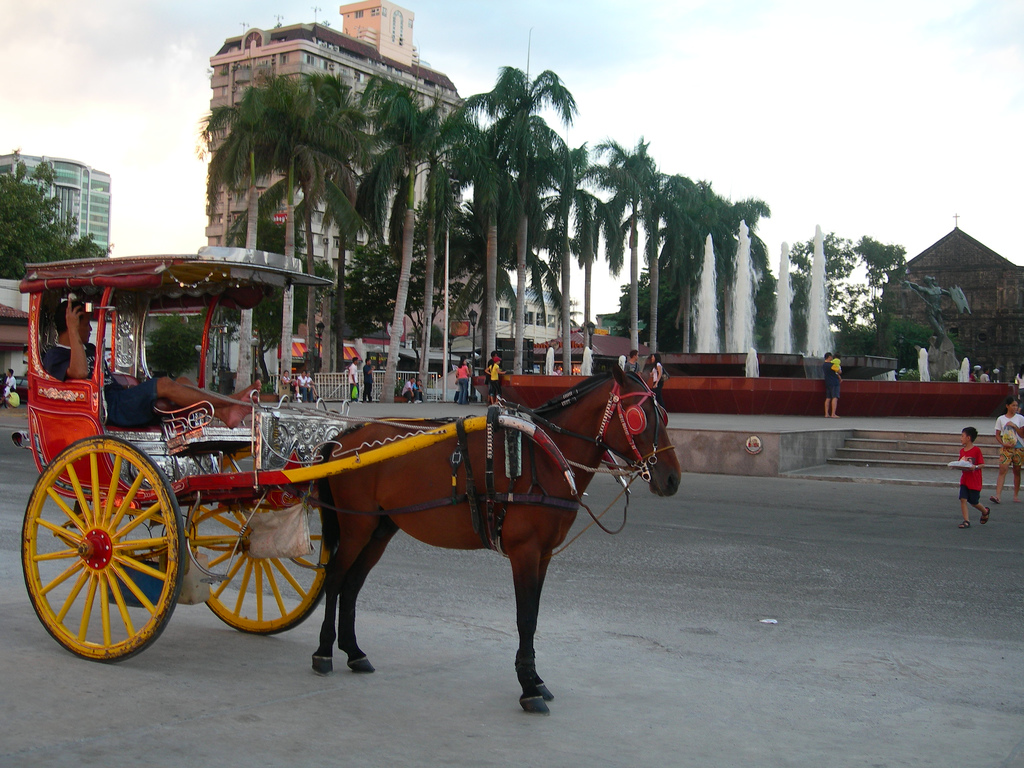
Kalesa historicaly, was one of the main land transportation in the Philippines during the Spanish and American era.

Jeepneys are a popular and iconic public utility vehicle; they have become a symbol of the Philippine culture. Another popular mode of public transportation in the country is the motorized tricycles, especially common in smaller urban and rural areas. The Philippines has four railway lines: Manila Light Rail Transit System Line 1 (LRT Line 1), LRT Line 2, MRT Line 3, and the PNR Metro Commuter Line operated by the Philippine National Railways. There are also steam engines found in the Visayas, mostly Negros island, which operate sugar mills such as Central Azucarera. Taxis and buses are also important modes of public transport in urban areas.

The Philippines has 12 international airports and more than 20 major and minor domestic airports serving the country. Ninoy Aquino International Airport is the country's chief airport.

== Road infrastructure ==
=== Roads ===
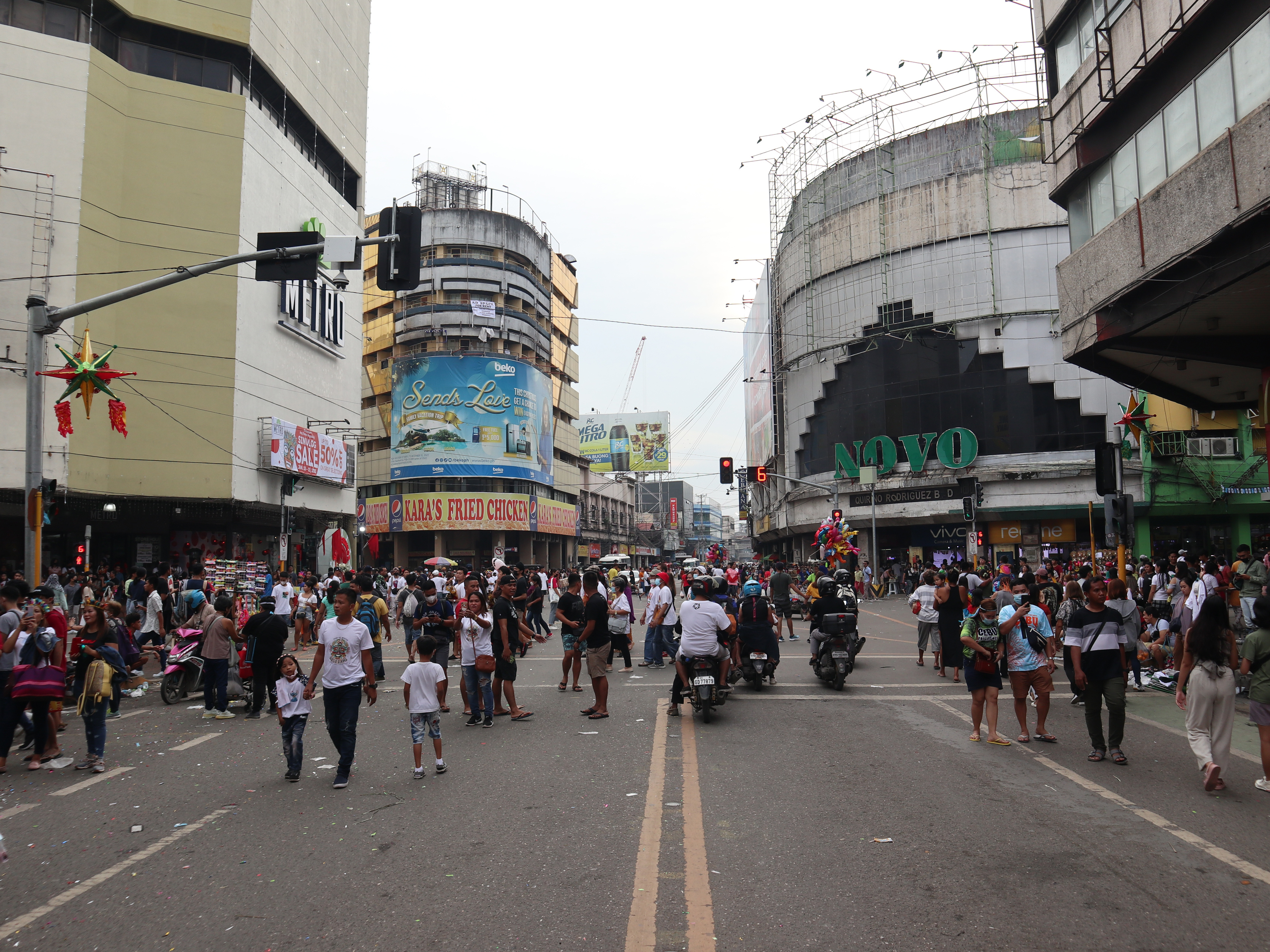
Colon Street in Cebu City, Cebu

As of October 2018, the Philippines has 217,317 kilometers (135,035 mi) of roads. The road network consists of:

- National roads – 33,018.25 kilometers (20,516.59 mi) (2019)
- Provincial roads – 31,620 kilometers (19,650 mi) (2018)
- City and municipal roads – 31,063 kilometers (19,302 mi) (2018)
- Barangay roads – 121,702 kilometers (75,622 mi) (2018)

In 1940, there were 22,970 kilometers (14,270 mi) of road in the entire country, half of which was in central and southern Luzon. The roads served 50,000 vehicles.

Road classification is based primarily on administrative responsibilities (with the exception of barangays), i.e., which level of government built and funded the roads. Most of the barangay roads are unpaved village-access roads built in the past by the Department of Public Works and Highways (DPWH), but responsibility for maintaining these roads have been devolved to local government units (LGUs). Farm-to-market roads fall under this category, and a few are financed by the Department of Agrarian Reform and the Department of Agriculture.

=== Highways ===
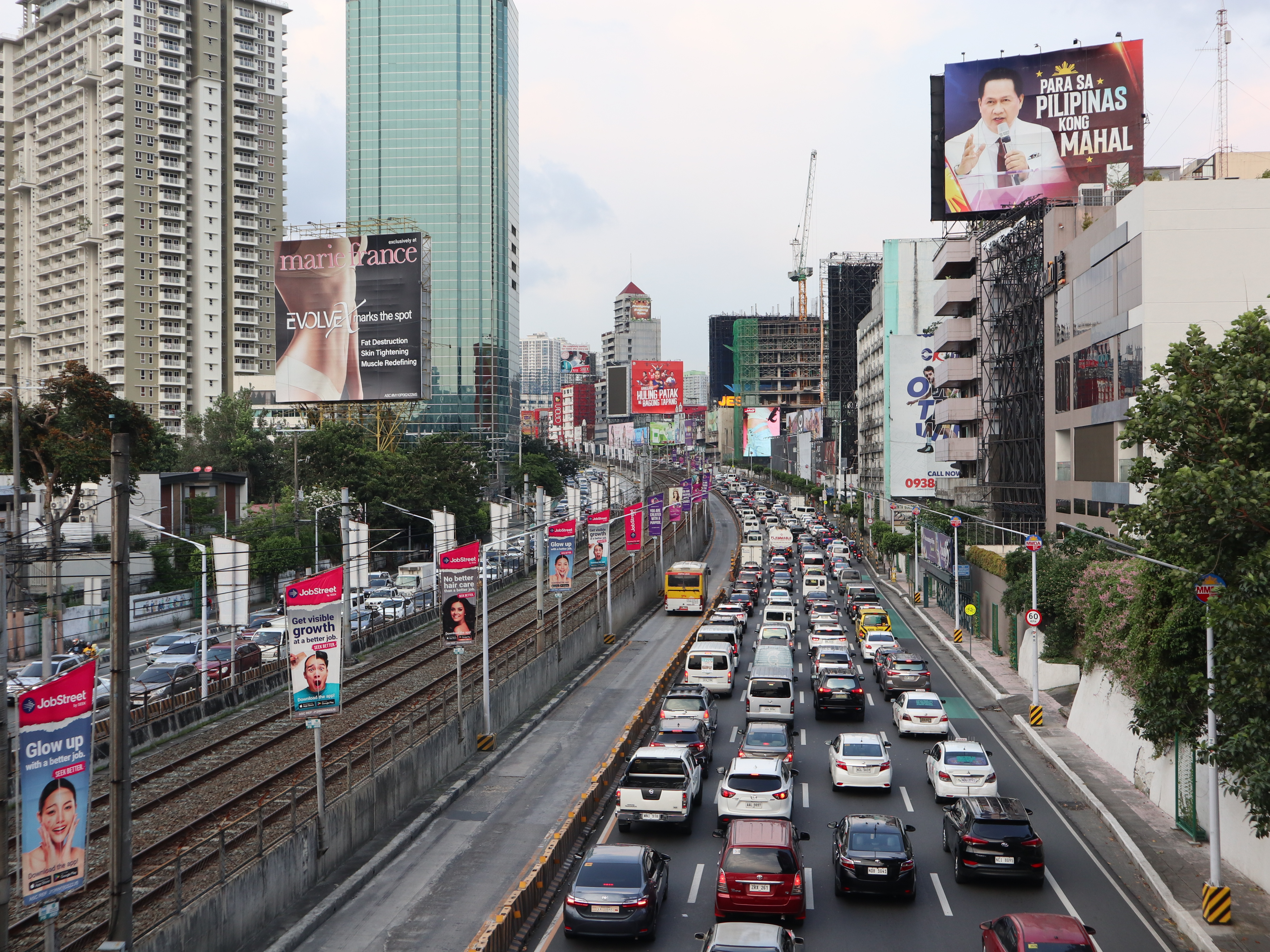
EDSA in Guadalupe Nuevo, Makati

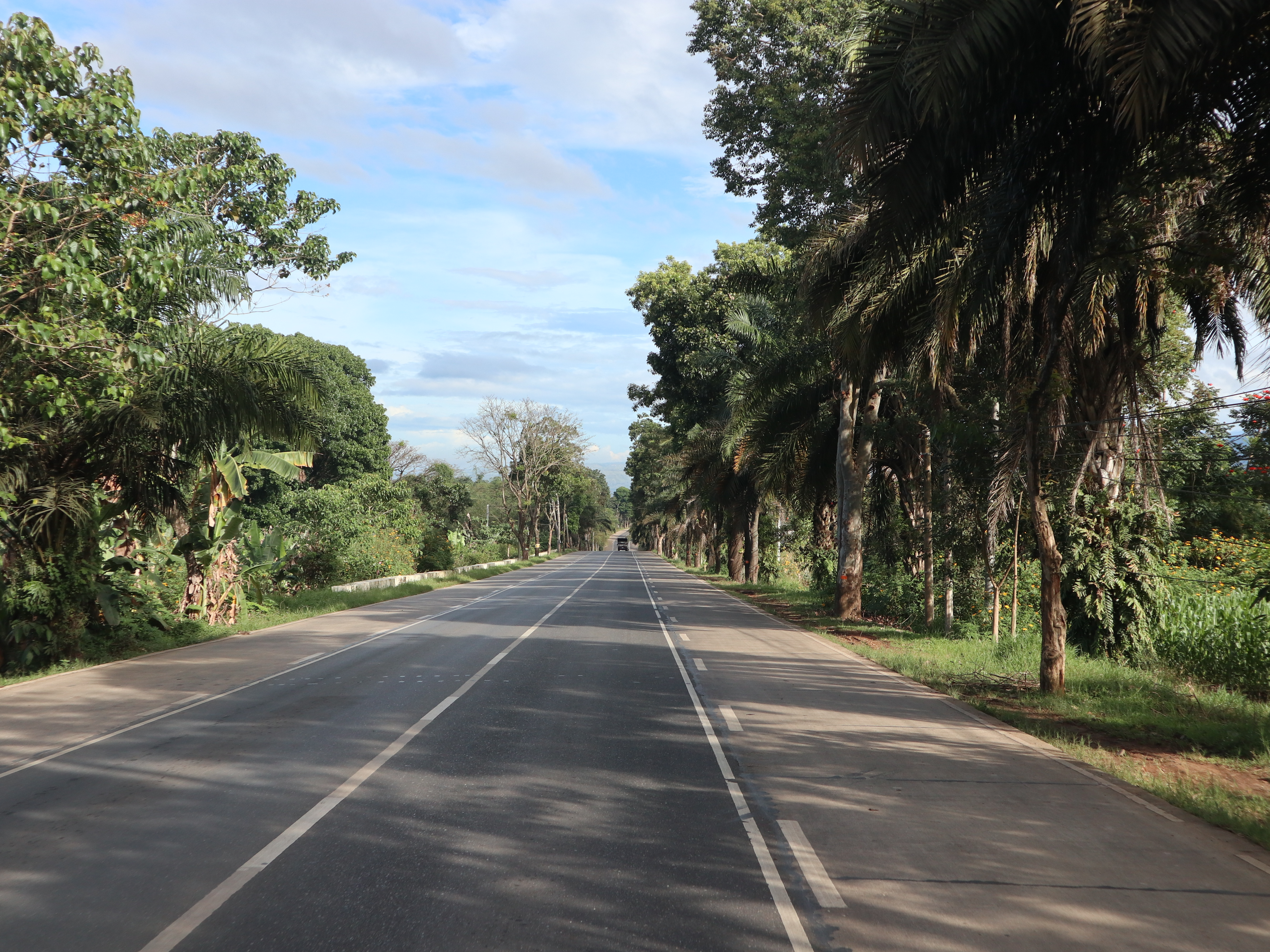
Sayre Highway in Bukidnon

Highways in the Philippines include national roads classified into three types: national primary, national secondary, and national tertiary roads.

The Pan-Philippine Highway is a 3,517 kilometres (2,185 mi) network of roads, bridges, and ferry services that connect the islands of Luzon, Samar, Leyte, and Mindanao, serving as the Philippines' principal transport backbone. The northern terminus of the highway is in Laoag, and the southern terminus is at Zamboanga City.

Epifanio de los Santos Avenue (EDSA) is one of the most known highways in the Philippines. The avenue passes through 6 of the 17 settlements in Metro Manila, namely, the cities of Caloocan, Quezon City, Mandaluyong, San Juan, Makati and Pasay. EDSA is the longest highway in the metropolis and handles an average of 2.34 million vehicles. Commonwealth Avenue is also an important highway in the metropolis, it serves the Quezon City area and has a length of 12.4 km (7.7 mi). Other important thoroughfares in Metro Manila that are part of the Philippine highway network include España Boulevard, Quezon Avenue, Taft Avenue, and the Alabang–Zapote Road.

Outside Metro Manila, the MacArthur Highway links Metro Manila to the provinces in central and northern Luzon. It is a component of both N1 (from Caloocan to Guiguinto) and N2 (from Guiguinto northwards to Laoag) of the Philippine highway network and Radial Road 9 (R-9) of Metro Manila's arterial road network. Both Kennon Road and Aspiras–Palispis Highway are major roads leading to and from Baguio. Aguinaldo Highway, Jose P. Laurel Highway, Manila South Road, and Calamba–Pagsanjan Road (part of Manila East Road) are the major roads in the Calabarzon region. Andaya Highway (N68) links the province of Quezon to Bicol Region. Located in Cebu City is the Colon Street, considered the oldest thoroughfare in the country. Among the major highways in Mindanao are Sayre Highway, Butuan–Cagayan de Oro–Iligan Road, Surigao–Davao Coastal Road, Davao–Cotabato Road, and Maria Clara L. Lobregat Highway.

The Strong Republic Nautical Highway links many of the islands' road networks through a series of roll-on/roll-off ferries, some rather small covering short distances and some larger vessels that might travel several hours or more.

=== Expressways ===
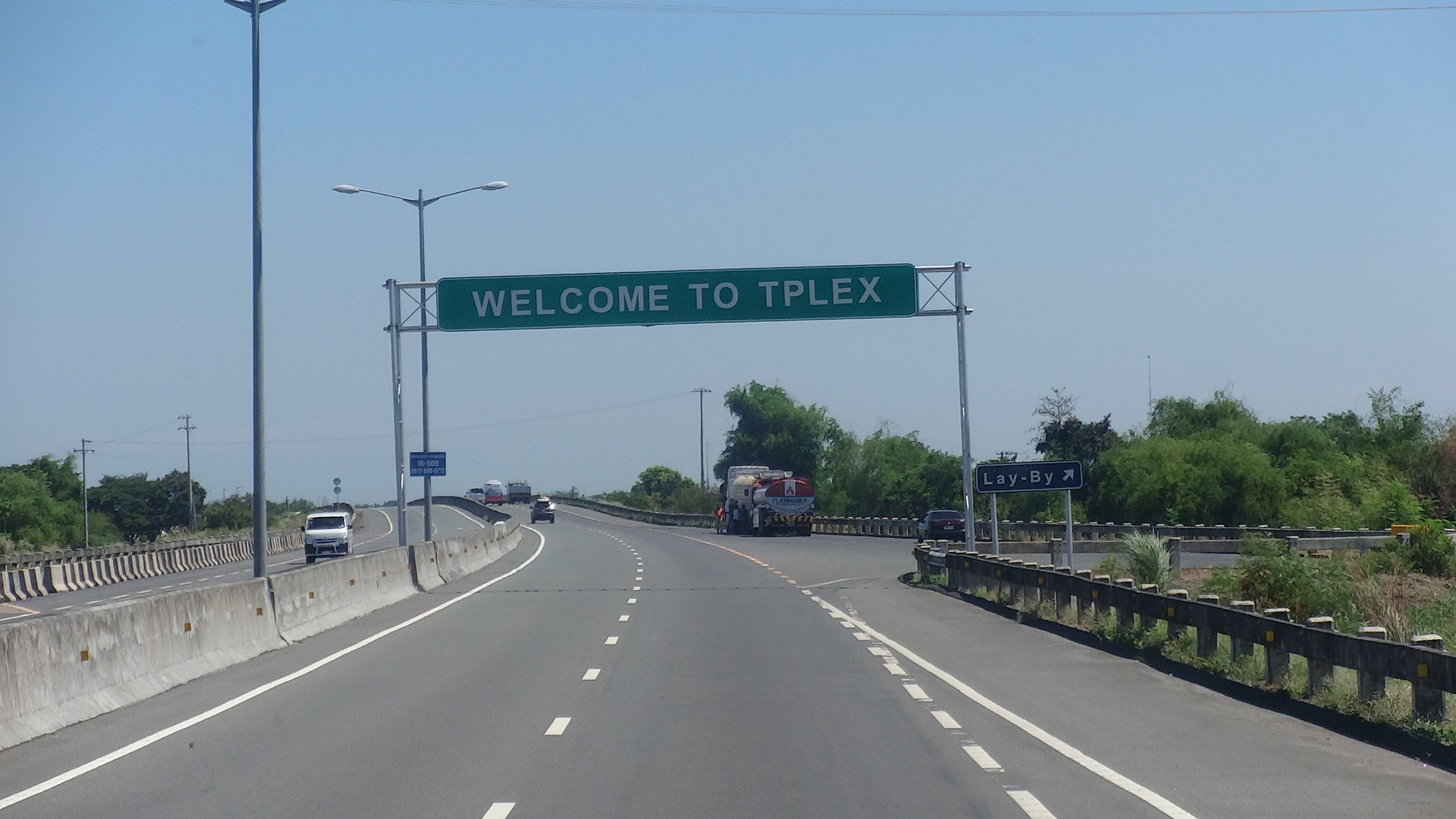
Tarlac–Pangasinan–La Union Expressway

The Philippines has numerous expressways and most of them are located in the main island of the country, Luzon. The first expressway systems in the country are the North Luzon Expressway formerly known as North Diversion Road and the South Luzon Expressway, formerly known as South Super Highway. Both were built in the 1970s, during the presidency of Ferdinand Marcos.

The North Luzon Expressway (NLEX) is a 4 to 8-lane limited-access toll expressway that connects Metro Manila to the provinces of the Central Luzon region. The expressway begins in Quezon City at a cloverleaf interchange with EDSA. It then passes through various cities and municipalities in the provinces of Bulacan and Pampanga. The expressway ends at Mabalacat and merges with the MacArthur Highway, which continues northward into the rest of Central and Northern Luzon.

The South Luzon Expressway (SLEX) is another important expressway in the country, it serves the southern part of Luzon. The expressway is a network of two expressways that connects Metro Manila to the provinces of Calabarzon in the southern part of Luzon. It starts at the Paco District of Manila then passes through Manila, Makati, Pasay, Parañaque, Taguig and Muntinlupa in Metro Manila; San Pedro, Biñan in Laguna; Carmona in Cavite, then transverses again to Biñan, Santa Rosa, Cabuyao and Calamba in the province of Laguna and ends in Santo Tomas, Batangas.

The Subic–Clark–Tarlac Expressway is another expressway that serves the region of Central Luzon, the expressway is linked to the North Luzon Expressway through the Mabalacat Interchange. Its southern terminus is at the Subic Bay Freeport Zone in Zambales, it passes through the Clark Freeport Zone and its northern terminus is at Brgy. Amucao in Tarlac City. Construction on the expressway began in April 2005, and opened to the public three years later.

The Manila–Cavite Expressway (CAVITEX), a 14-km expressway that runs from Parañaque to Kawit, Cavite, also passes through Las Pinas and Bacoor.

The Southern Tagalog Arterial Road (STAR), a 41-kilometer expressway that runs through the province of Batangas, connecting Santo Tomas to Batangas City.

The Cavite–Laguna Expressway (CALAX) is an expressway that connects Cavite, Laguna and Metro Manila. As of 2023, it connects Silang and Biñan, with construction ongoing for the remainder.

The Philippine government and other private sectors are building more plans and proposals to build new expressways through public–private partnership.

== Road transportation ==
As of May 2022, there are over 5.8 million registered motor vehicles in the country, with motorcycles and tricycles accounting for 60 percent of all registered motor vehicles, followed by utility vehicles at 18 percent, cars and SUVs at 16 percent, and trucks at 3 percent.

=== Automobiles ===
The Philippines' automobile industry started during the American colonial period from 1898 to 1946, with the introduction of American-made cars, which have been sold in the Philippines ever since. An import substitution policy was developed for the 1950s, which led to the prohibition of and then punishingly high tariffs on the import of fully built-up cars (CBUs) from 1951 until 1972. During the 1973 oil crisis, Philippine president Ferdinand Marcos advised Filipinos to buy smaller, more efficient vehicles with four-cylinder engines. In the early 1970s, the local Volkswagen assembler attempted to build a native national car, the "Volkswagen Sakbayan" (short for sasakyangkatutubongbayan), to avoid reliance on imported "completely-knocked-down" or "semi-knocked-down" parts, but this did not last long. In 1972, the government instituted the Progressive Car Manufacturing Program (PCMP), a system with scheduled increases in local parts content requirement which also allowed program participants to import a certain proportion of CBU vehicles. The original participants were General Motors, Ford, PAMCOR (a Chrysler/Mitsubishi joint venture), Delta Motors Corporation (Toyota), and Nissan Motor Philippines.

As of May 2022, cars (sedan, hatchback, pick-up trucks, "Asian Utility Vehicle" like the Toyota Innova) account for 9 percent of all registered motor vehicles in the country, while SUVs account for 7 percent of the total.

=== Bus ===
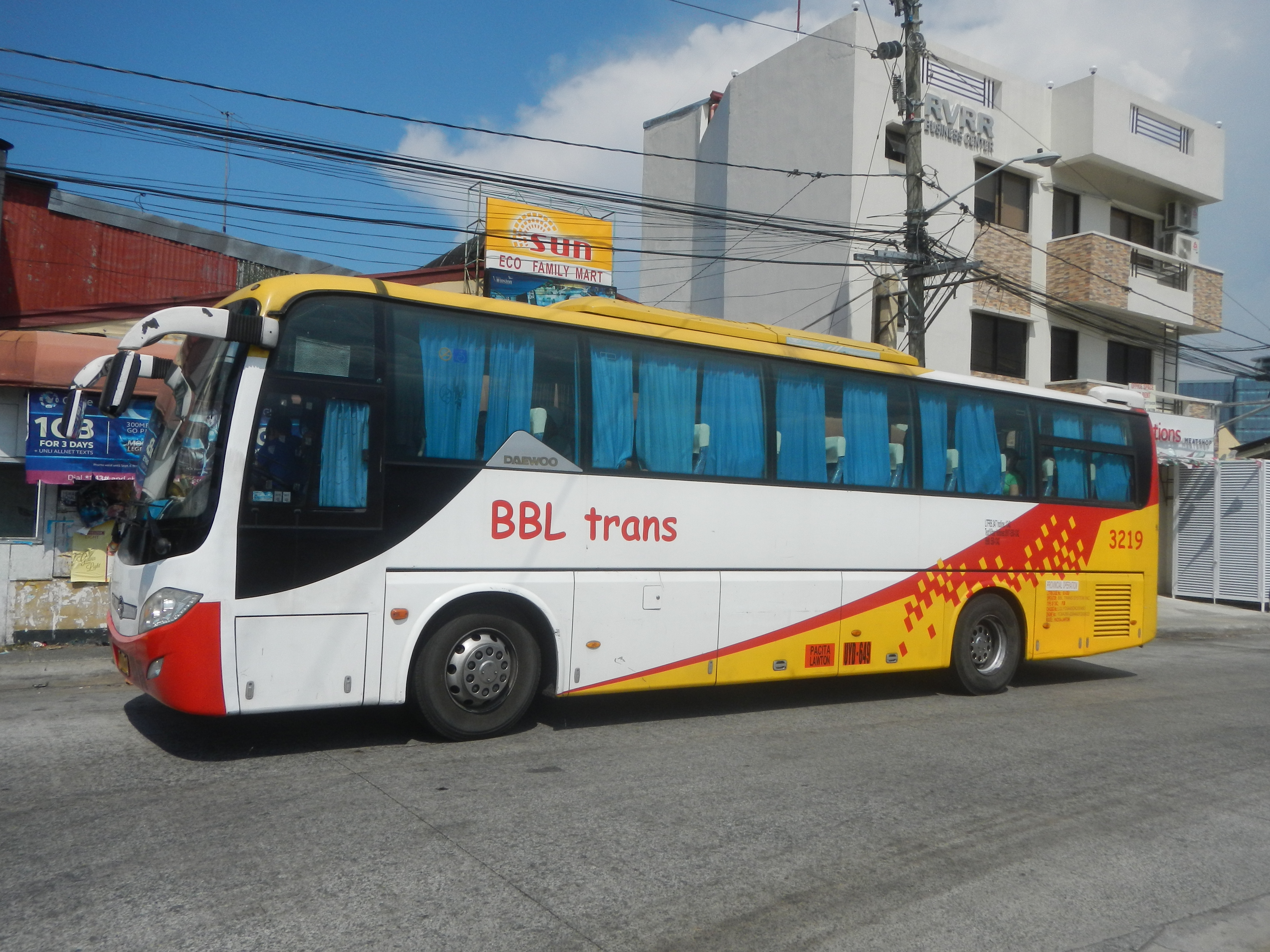
A BBL Trans provincial bus in Biñan, Laguna

Buses, after ferries and airlines, are the next primary mode of long-distance transportation in the Philippines.

Public bus services in the Philippines are divided into two types: provincial buses and city buses. Provincial buses are used for medium to long-haul routes between cities and towns (including those involving ferries). City bus networks exist in the three metropolitan areas (Metro Manila, Metro Cebu, Metro Davao). Bus services are run by private companies, and routes, operations and fares are regulated by the Land Transportation Franchising and Regulatory Board (LTFRB).

Bus rapid transit (BRT) systems exist in some regions. Extant BRT systems are the EDSA Carousel in Metro Manila and the Clark Loop in Clark Freeport Zone. A third BRT system is under construction in Cebu City. An integrated bus transit system will also be implemented in Davao City.

=== Motorcycles ===
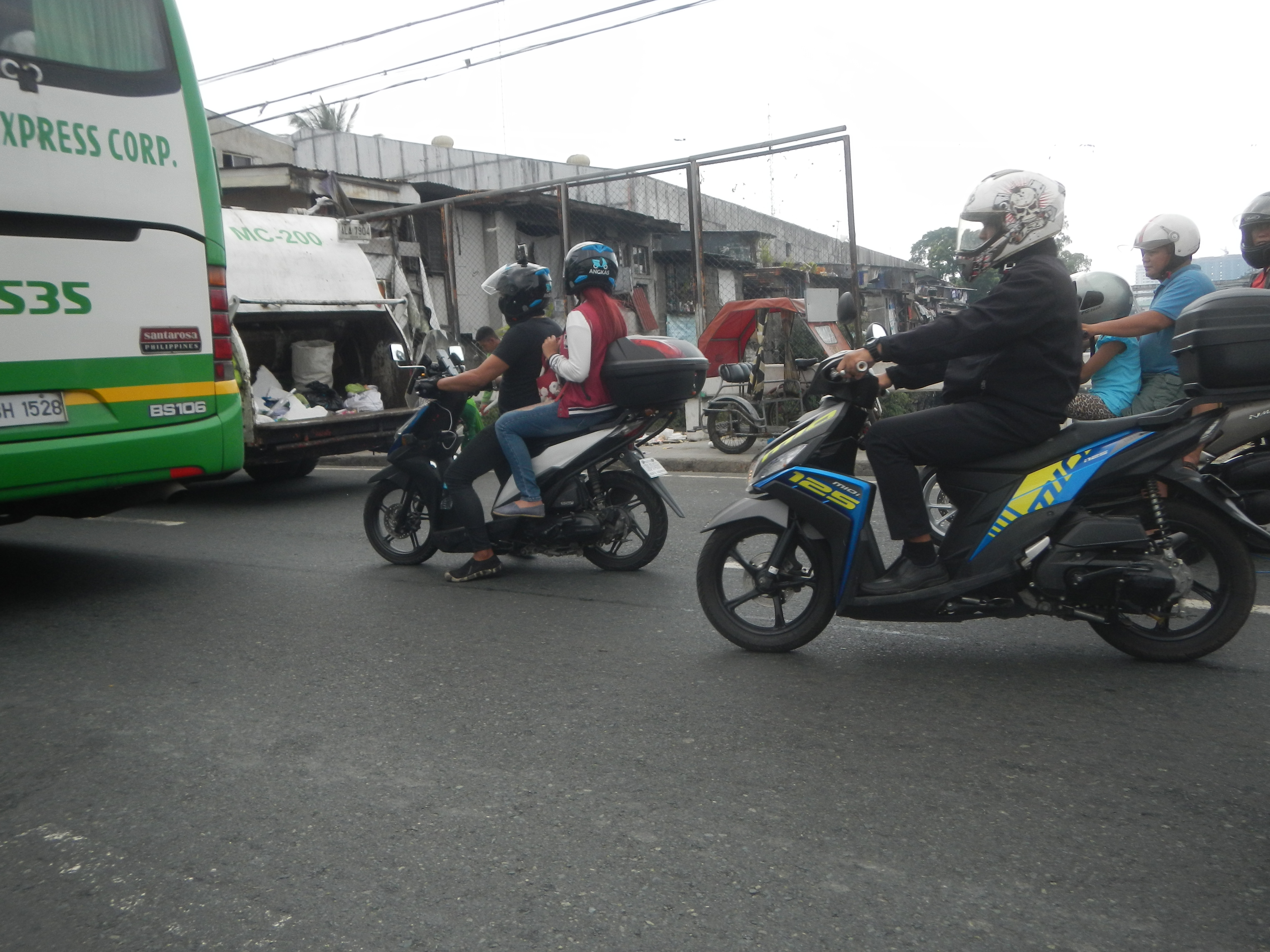
Motorcycle riders with back riders along Park Avenue in Pasay

Motorcycles are the most dominant form of private transportation in the country, accounting for 49 percent of all registered motor vehicles as of May 2022. A Social Weather Stations survey in 2021 also reveals that 36 percent of households nationwide reported owning a motorcycle, accounting for 50 percent of vehicle owners. They are commonly used for package and food delivery services to transport goods and are often regarded as a cheaper alternative to buying a private car. Motorcycles are also regarded for their size which allows them to easily split through lanes in heavily congested traffic corridors and be easily stored or parked. They have also been used for taxi services, commonly referred to as an angkas.

The use of motorcycles grew in popularity in the country started in the 1990s with motorcycle enthusiasts that went on leisure rides and delivery companies that sought a cheap, efficient way of moving goods around. Initially limited to American brands, the entry of Chinese, Japanese, and Taiwanese motorcycle brands disrupted the market throughout the early 2000s and sparked a growing interest in motorcycle ownership and usage. By 2005, the number of registered motorcycles surpassed that of cars.

=== Limousines ===
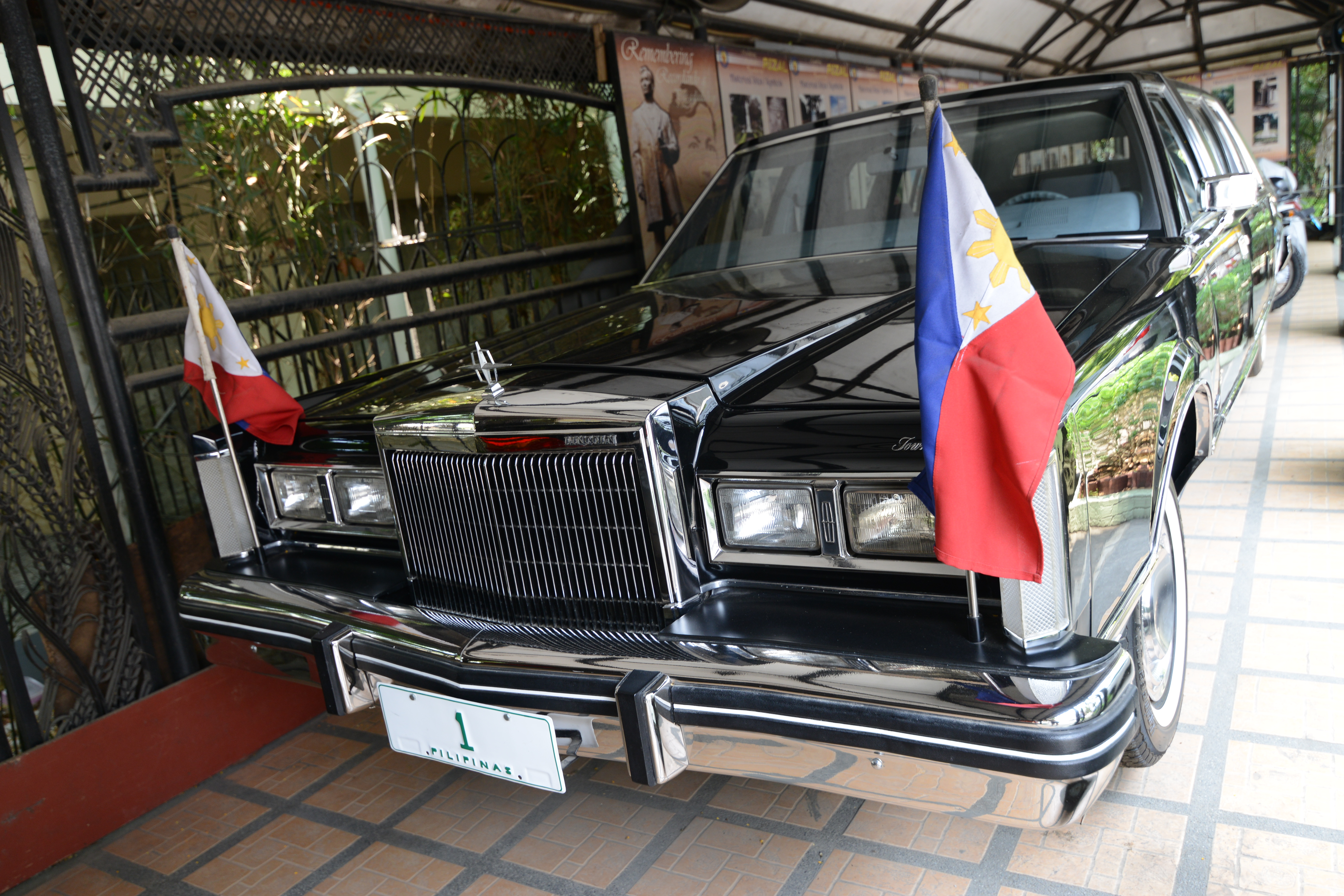
The Lincoln Continental Presidential limousine used by President Ferdinand Marcos, 2014 prior to its relocation to Presidential Car Museum in 2018

Limousines are used by the president and vice-president of the Philippines, as well as wedding services for wealthy families, hotel and resort shuttles, and airport transfers. Otherwise, they are seldom seen on Philippine roads due to considerations like cost and road traffic conditions but if used, they are utilized for bridal events or limo services. Limousines include the Chrysler 300C, Lincoln Town Car, Mercedes-Benz E-Class, Audi A8, BMW 7 Series, S-Class, Lexus ES, and Lexus LS as well as SUV-based limousines such as the Cadillac Escalade, Chevrolet Suburban, Ford Expedition, and Hummer H2.

=== Jeepneys ===
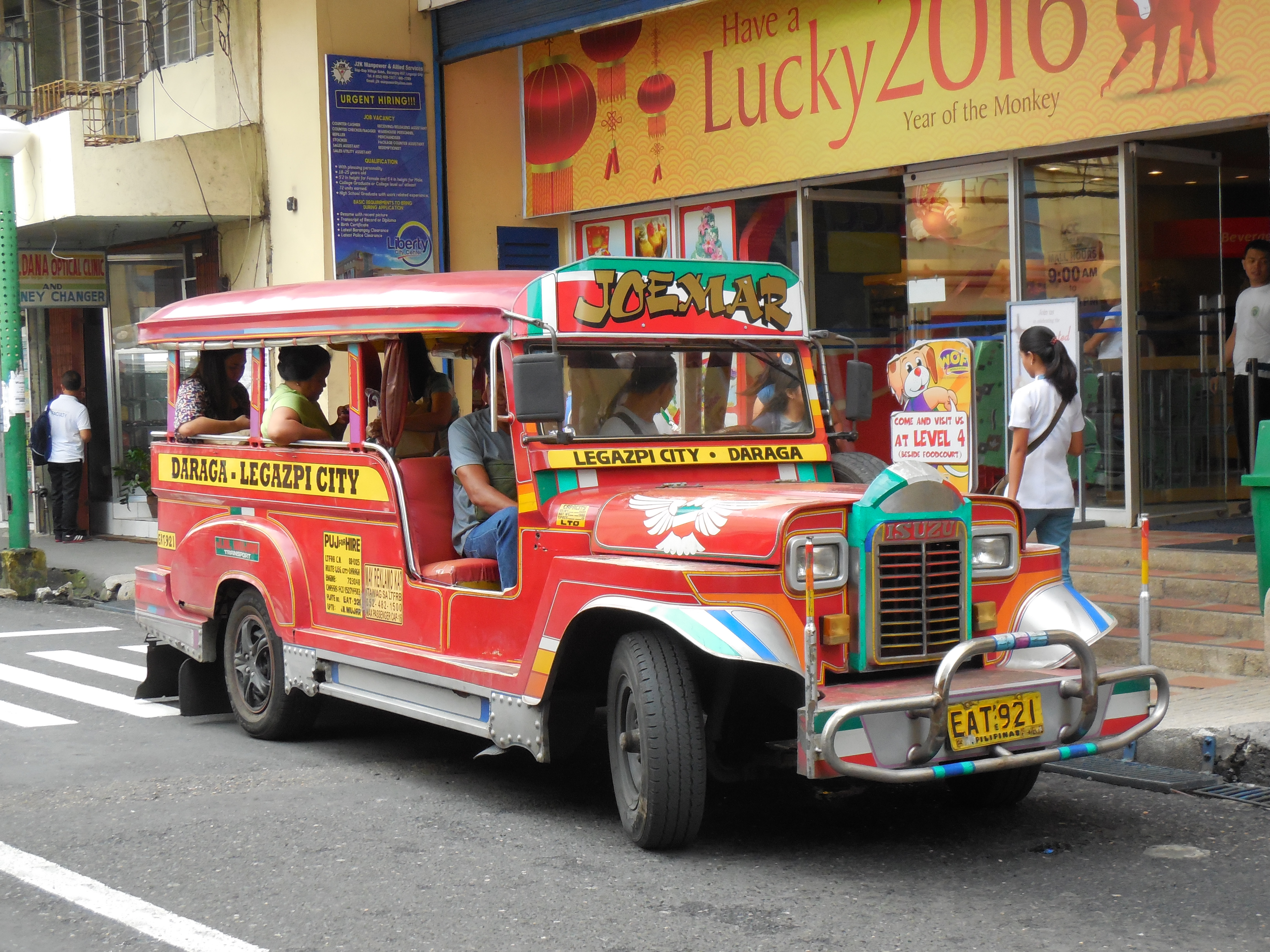
A typical jeepney in Legazpi, Albay

Jeepneys are the most popular means of public transportation in the Philippines. They were originally made from US military jeeps left over from World War II and are known for their flamboyant decoration and crowded seating. They have become a ubiquitous symbol of Filipino culture.

Original jeepneys were simply refurbished military jeeps by Willys and Ford, modern jeepneys are now produced by independently owned workshops and factories in the Philippines with surplus engines and parts coming from Japan. In the central island of Cebu, the bulk of jeepneys are built from second-hand Japanese trucks, originally intended for cargo. These are euphemistically known as "surplus" trucks.

There are two classes of jeepney builders in the Philippines. The backyard builders produce one to five vehicles a month, source their die-stamped pieces from one of the larger manufacturers, and work with used engines and chassis from salvage yards (usually the Isuzu 4BA1, 4BC2, 4BE1 series diesel engines or the Mitsubishi Fuso 4D30 diesel engines). The second type is the large volume manufacturer. They have two subgroups: the PUJ, or "public utility jeep," and the large volume metal-stamping companies that supply parts as well as complete vehicles.

The jeepney builders in the past were mostly based in Cebu City and Las Piñas. The largest manufacturer of vintage-style army jeepneys is MD Juan. Other makers include Armak Motors (San Pablo, Laguna), Celestial Motors (San Pablo, Laguna), Hebron Motors, LGS Motors, Malagueña (Imus, Cavite), Mega (Lipa, Batangas), Morales Motors (San Mateo, Rizal), and Sarao Motors (Las Piñas). Another manufacturer, PBJ Motors, manufactured jeepneys in Pampanga using techniques derived from Sarao Motors. Armak sells remanufactured trucks and vehicles as an adjunct, alongside its jeepneys.

=== Motorized tricycles ===
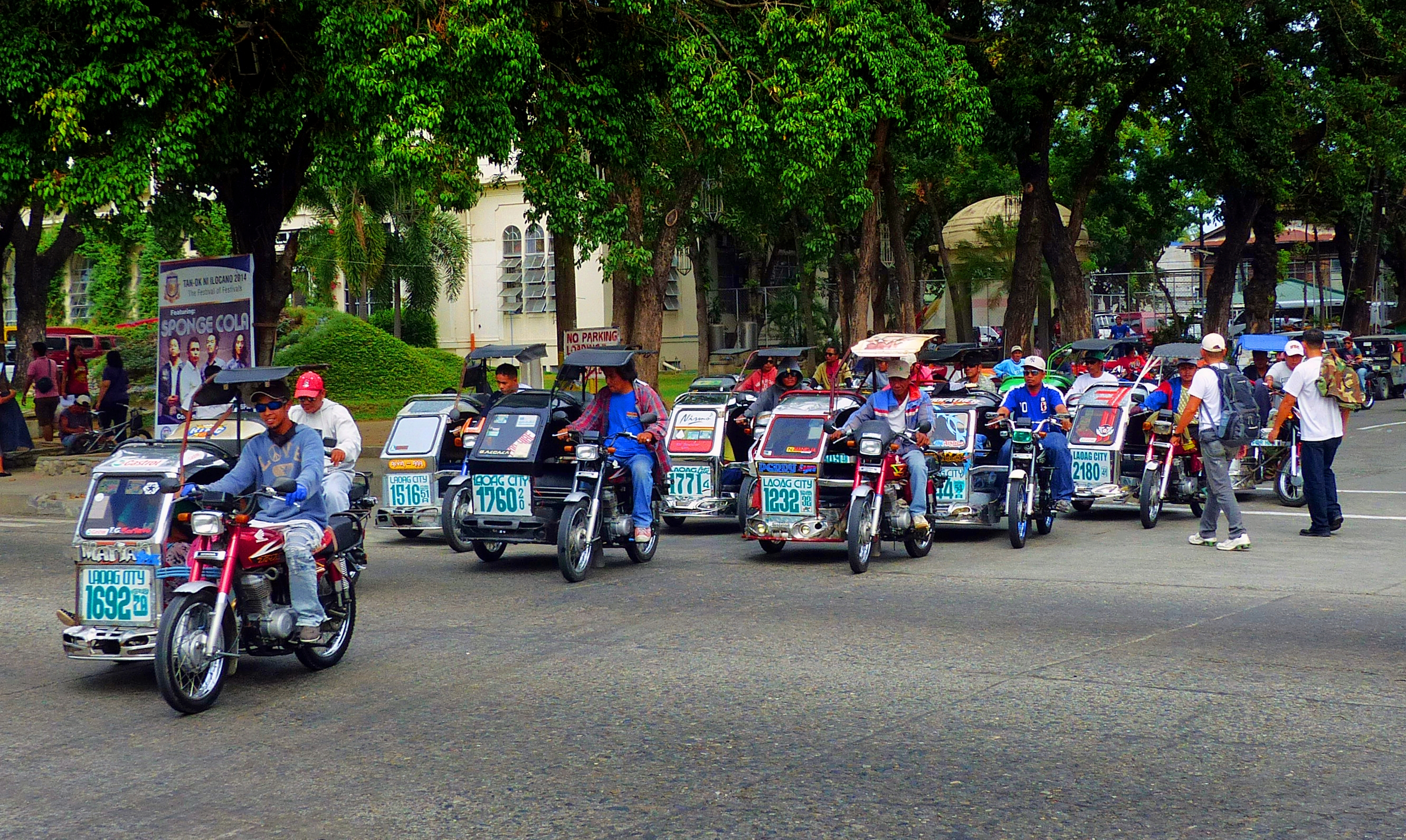
Motorized tricycles in Laoag, Ilocos Norte in 2014

In the Philippines, motorized tricycles (or simply tricycles or trikes; Filipino: traysikel; Cebuano: traysikol) refer to a type of motorized vehicle consisting of a motorcycle and a passenger cab (ie, a sidecar) attached to it. Along with the jeepney, the Philippine tricycle is one of the most common means of public or private transportation in the country, especially in rural areas. These public utility vehicles either ply a set route or are for-hire, like taxis.

As of May 2022, motorized tricycles account for 11 percent of all registered motor vehicles in the country.

=== Taxi ===
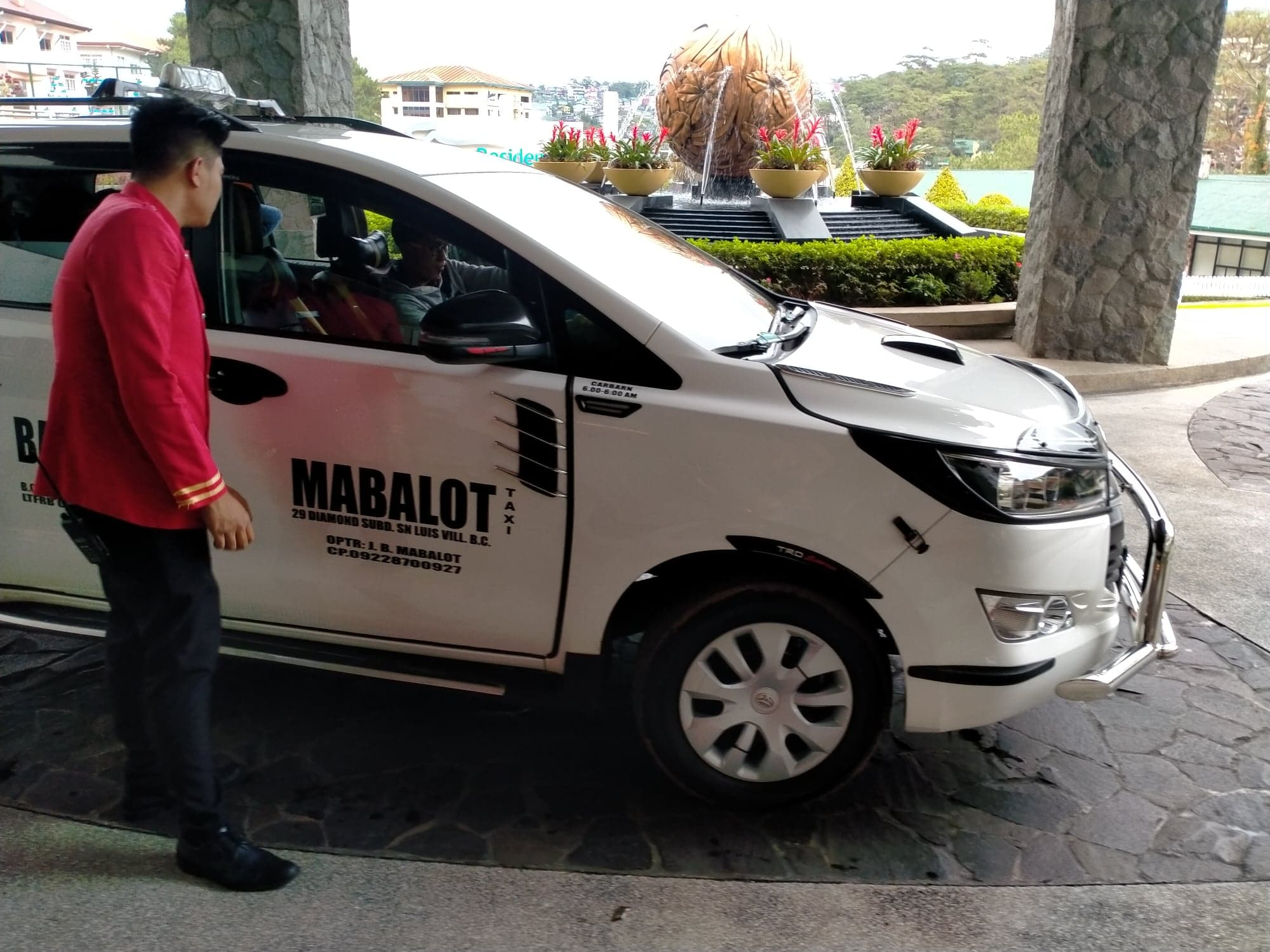
A Toyota Innova taxi in Baguio, 2021

Taxis are one of the modes of transportation in the country. They are regulated by the Department of Transportation (DOTr), the Land Transportation Office (LTO), and the Land Transportation Franchising and Regulatory Board (LTFRB). The taxicabs there vary from models and uses. Most taxicabs have yellow colored license plates, taxi signs, LTFRB Registration number, and taximeter, which is mandatory in every cab.

Taxis from the Philippines are usually present in metropolitan areas.

=== Non-motorized land transport ===
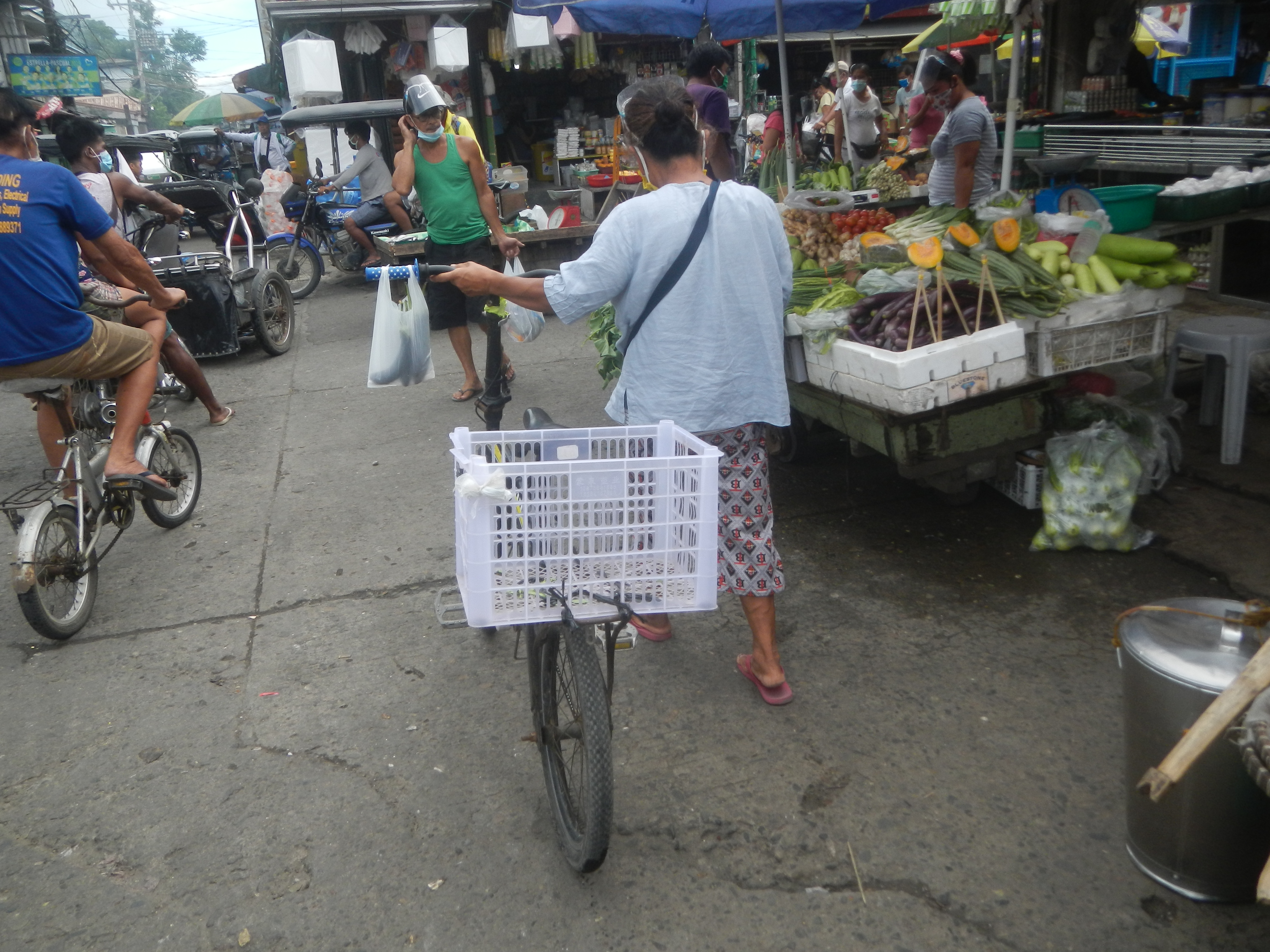
A woman carrying her bicycle through a market in Baliwag, Bulacan

Human-powered and animal-powered transport exist in the Philippines in the form of walking, cycling, pedicabs (also known as traysikad or padyak), and horse- or cattle-drawn kalesas. The United Nations and such organizations as Clean Air Asia support the integration of non-motorized transport as part of a clean and "highly cost-effective transportation strategy" that "brings about large health, economic and social co-benefits, particularly for the urban poor."

In Marikina, the local government constructed a network of bikeways to help reduce air pollution, greenhouse gas emissions, fuel consumption, and traffic congestion in the city. The bikeways project was awarded by the World Health Organization in 2008 in the category of climate change and health.

According to a survey conducted by the Social Weather Stations on bicycle ownership in May 2021, over 20 percent of households nationwide reported owning a bicycle, accounting for 27 percent of vehicle owners.

== Rail transportation ==
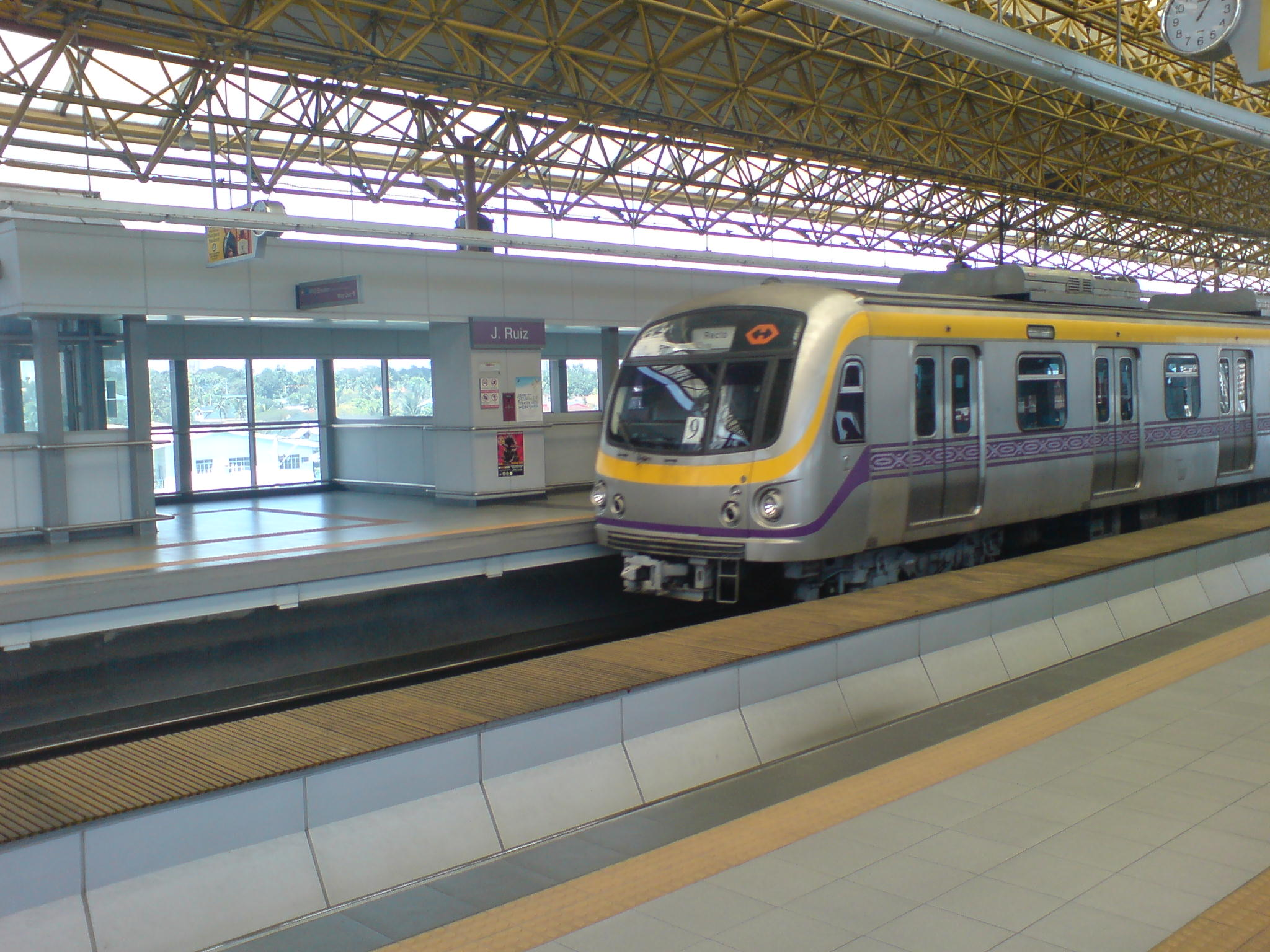
The LRT Line 2 in 2009

Rail transportation in the Philippines includes services provided by three rapid transit lines and one commuter rail line: the Manila Light Rail Transit System (Lines 1 and 2), Manila Metro Rail Transit System (Line 3) and the PNR Metro Commuter Line. The government has plans to expand the country's railway footprint from 77 kilometers as of 2017 to more than 320 kilometers by 2022. These railway lines are currently operating in Metro Manila, as well as commuter services in Calabarzon and in Bicol Region.

The Manila Light Rail Transit System (LRT) is a rapid transit system serving the Metro Manila area, it is the first metro system in Southeast Asia. The system served a total 928,000 passengers each day in 2012. Its 31 stations along over 31 kilometers (19 mi) of mostly elevated track form two lines: the original Line 1, and the more modern Line 2 which passes through the cities of Caloocan, Manila, Marikina, Pasay, San Juan and Quezon City. Apart from the LRT system, the Manila Metro Rail Transit System (MRT) system also serves Metro Manila. The system is located along the Epifanio de los Santos Avenue (EDSA), one of Metro Manila's main thoroughfares. It has 13 stations along its 16.95 km track form a single line which is the Line 3 which passes through the cities of Makati, Mandaluyong, Pasay and Quezon City. Some of the stations of the system have been retrofitted with escalators and elevators for easier access, and ridership has increased. By 2004, Line 3 had the highest ridership of the three lines, with 400,000 passengers daily.

The Philippine National Railways (PNR) operates a commuter line that serves a region from Metro Manila south toward Laguna. PNR, a state-owned railway system of the Philippines, alongside a tramway system in Manila, were established during the Spanish Colonial period. The intercity rail used to provide services on Luzon, connecting northern and southern Luzon with Manila; on the other hand, the tramway served what is known today as Metro Manila. In 1988, the railway line to northern Luzon became disused and later the services to Bicol were halted although plans to revive the southern line are around as of 2017. Panay Railways is a company that ran rail lines on Panay until 1989 and Cebu until World War II.

Future projects in the pipeline, such as the North–South Commuter Railway (NSCR), a 147-km railway connecting Clark Freeport in Pampanga to Calamba, Laguna, will utilize the old PNR right of way; the Metro Manila Subway, a 36-kilometer underground rapid transit, will connect from East Valenzuela to NAIA Terminal 3 or Bicutan; the MRT-4, a 12-kilometer elevated railway, will connect Ortigas Center to Taytay, Rizal; and the MRT-7, a 22-km elevated route, will connect from North EDSA to San Jose Del Monte, Bulacan.

== Water transportation ==
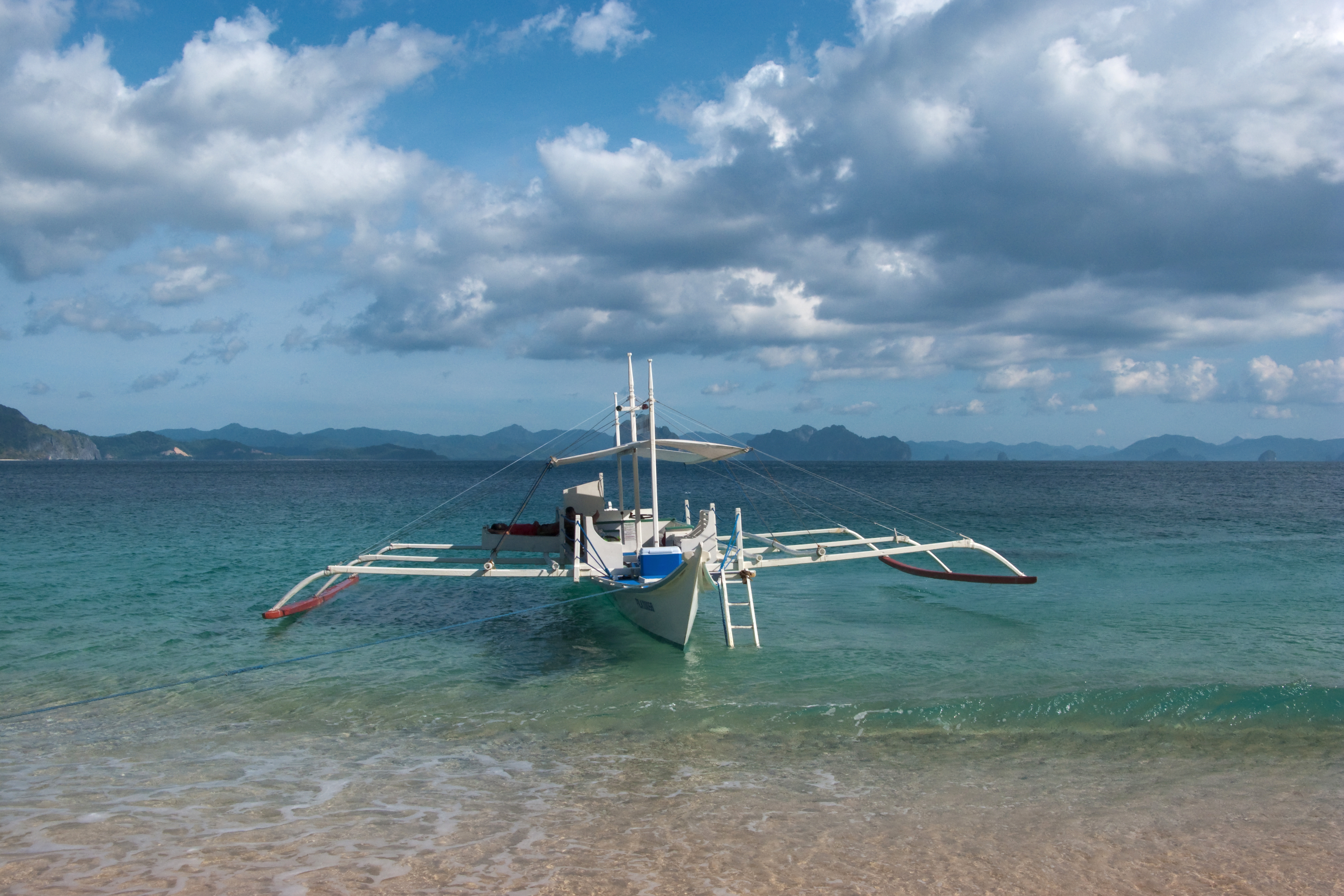
A pump boat off the coast of Palawan (island)

=== Boats ===
Motorized and non-motorized boats are the primary mode of water transportation between islands and across inland and coastal waters. The native bangka is also typically used for fishing, transporting goods, and island hopping tours.

=== River ferries ===
The Pasig River Ferry Service is a river ferry service that serves Metro Manila, it is also the only water-based transportation that cruised the Pasig River. The entire ferry network had 17 stations operational and 2 lines. The first line was the Pasig River Line which stretched from Plaza Mexico in Intramuros, Manila to Nagpayong station in Pasig. The second line was the Marikina River Line which served the Guadalupe station in Makati up to Santa Elena station in Marikina.

=== Ferry services ===
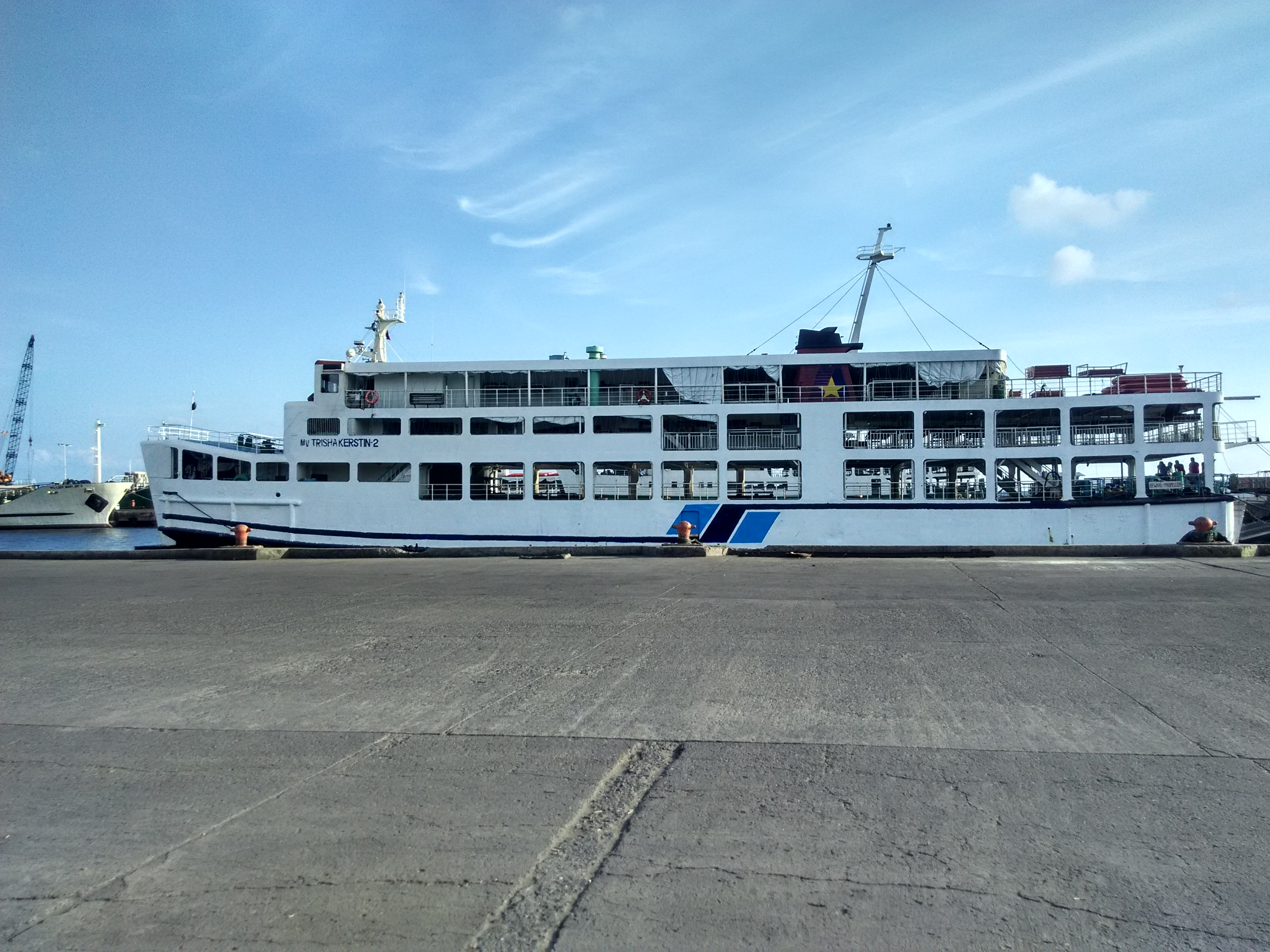
MV Trisha Kerstin 2 in Zamboanga International Seaport

Because it is an island nation, ferry services are an important means of transportation. A range of ships are used, from large cargo ships to small pump boats. Some trips last for a day or two on large overnight ferries. There are numerous shipping companies in the Philippines. Notable companies include 2GO Travel, Starlite Ferries, Montenegro Lines, and Trans-Asia Shipping Lines. Other trips can last for less than 15 minutes on small, open-air pump boats such as those that cross the Iloilo Strait or between the Caticlan jetty port and Boracay island.

=== Ports and harbors ===
The busiest port is the Port of Manila, especially the Manila International Cargo Terminal and the Eva Macapagal Port Terminal, both in the pier area of Manila. Other cities with bustling ports and piers include Bacolod, Batangas City, Cagayan de Oro, Cebu City, Davao City, Butuan, Iligan, Iloilo City, Jolo, Legazpi City, Lucena City, Puerto Princesa, San Fernando, Subic, Zamboanga City, Cotabato City, General Santos, Allen, Ormoc, Ozamiz, Surigao and Tagbilaran. Most of these terminals comprise the Strong Republic Nautical Highway, a nautical system conceptualized under the term of President Gloria Macapagal Arroyo where land vehicles can use the roll-on/roll-off (ro-ro) ferries to cross between the different islands.

== Air transportation ==
=== Airports ===
Manila, Iloilo, Cebu, Davao, Clark, Subic, Zamboanga, Laoag, Legazpi and Puerto Princesa are the only international gateways to the country, with Ninoy Aquino International Airport (NAIA) in Manila as the main and premier gateway of the country.

Ninoy Aquino International Airport serves as the primary gateway of the Philippines, it serves the Metro Manila area and its surrounding regions, located in the boundary of Parañaque and Pasay in the National Capital Region. In 2012, NAIA became the 34th busiest airport in the world, passenger volume increased to about eight percent to a total of 32.1 million passengers, making it one of the busiest airports in Asia.

Clark International Airport is also a major gateway to the country. It was originally planned to replace Ninoy Aquino International Airport as the country's premier airport, amid the plan to shut down Ninoy Aquino International Airport. The airport mostly serves low-cost carriers that avail themselves of the lower landing fees than those charged at NAIA.

Other important airports in the Philippines are Mactan–Cebu International Airport in Lapu-Lapu City, Cebu; Iloilo International Airport in Cabatuan, Iloilo; Francisco Bangoy International Airport in Davao City; Zamboanga International Airport in Zamboanga City; Puerto Princesa International Airport in Puerto Princesa, Palawan; General Santos International Airport in General Santos; and Bicol International Airport in Legazpi, Albay.

=== Airlines ===
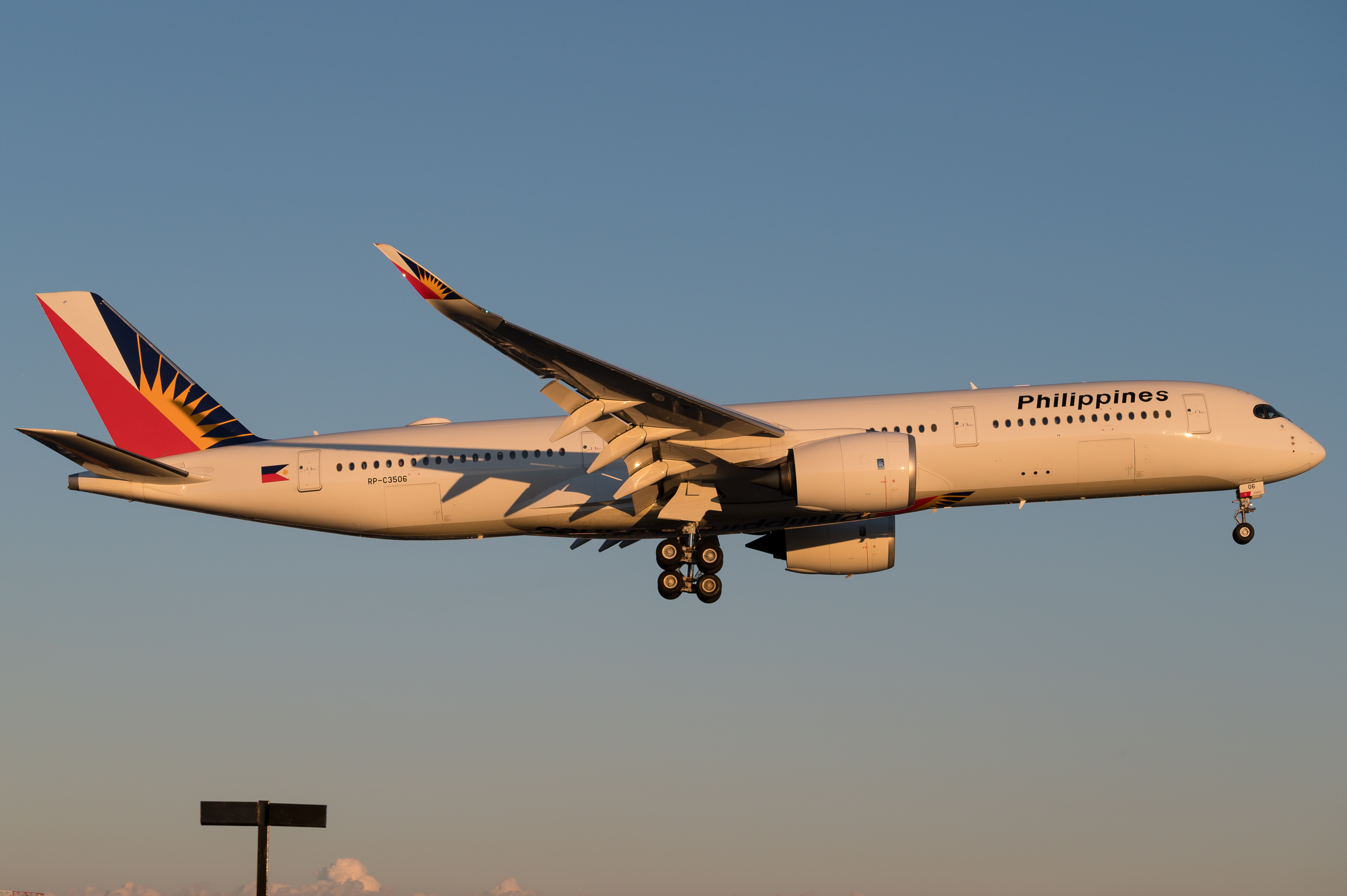
Philippine Airlines, the country's flag carrier

Philippine Airlines (PAL) is the national flag carrier of the Philippines and is the first commercial airline in Asia. As of 2013, Philippine Airlines flies to 8 domestic and 58 international destinations in 33 countries and territories across Asia, North America, and Oceania. The airlines operates hubs in Clark, Manila, Cebu, and Davao. Philippine Airlines (PAL) also announced the return of nonstop flights between Manila and New Chitose Airport (Sapporo) starting November 24, 2025, restoring direct connectivity important for tourism and cultural exchange after pandemic suspensions.

Cebu Pacific is considered to be the country's low-cost carrier and leading domestic airline, flying to 37 domestic destinations. Since the launching of its international operations in November 2001, flies to 27 destinations in 15 countries and territories across Asia. As of 2024, the airline operates hubs in Manila, Cebu, Davao, Clark, and Iloilo. In 2026, Cebu Pacific announced its entry into the Saudi Arabian market with the launch of direct flights between Manila and Riyadh. The service, scheduled to begin on March 1, 2026, marked the airline’s expansion into long-haul operations in the Middle East and aimed to improve air connectivity for overseas Filipino workers in Saudi Arabia. The route is operated four times weekly using wide-body aircraft.

Other low-cost carriers in the country include Cebgo, PAL Express, and Philippines AirAsia. These airlines have routes to several tourist destinations in the country.

== Issues ==
With the rapid growth in economic activities and urbanization, public utility vehicles, along with private vehicles, exponentially increased in numbers, which resulted in poorer air quality and frequent traffic congestion in the cities.

=== Traffic congestion ===
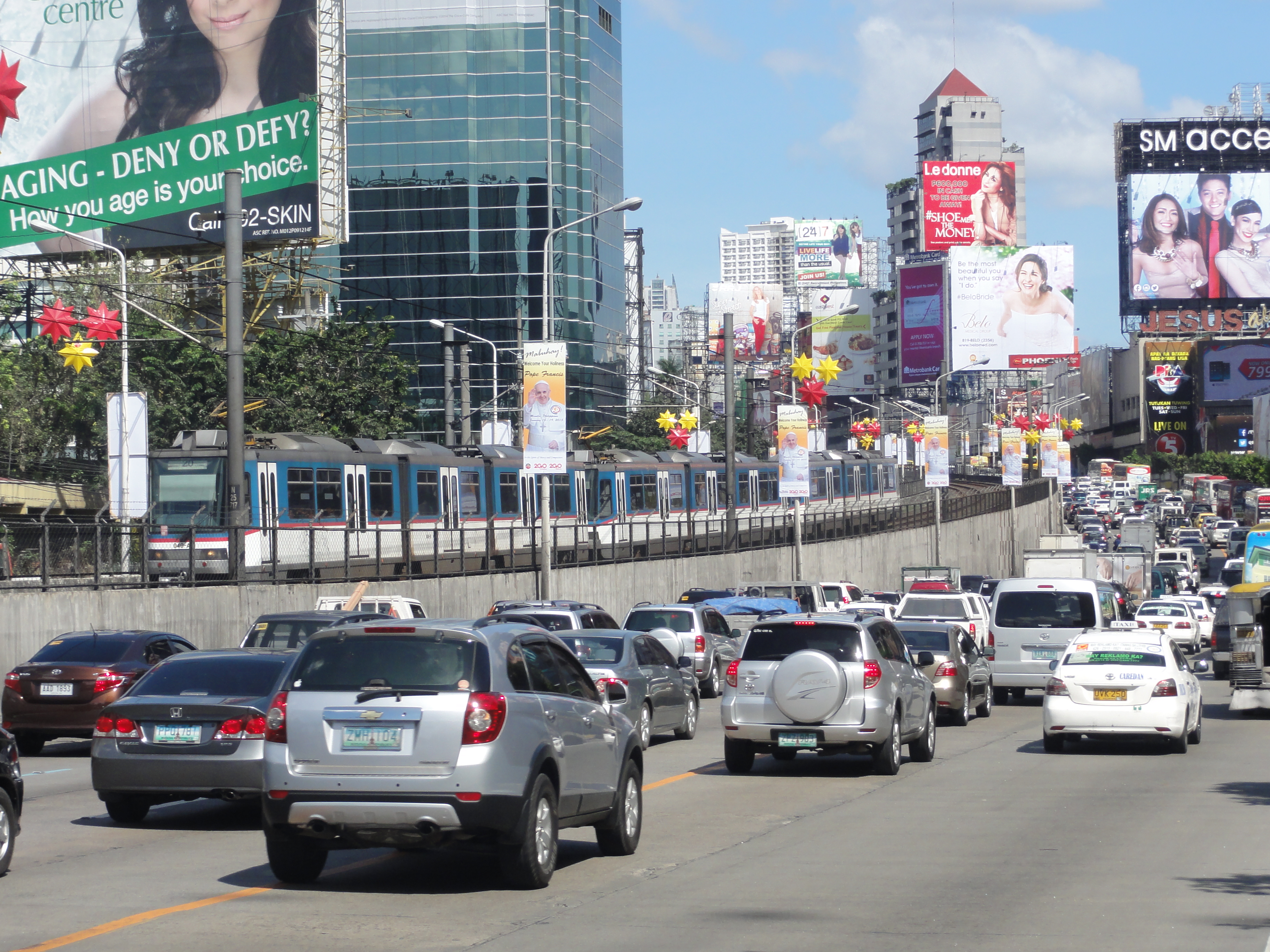
Traffic congestion along Epifanio de los Santos Avenue

Traffic congestion is an issue in Metro Manila. According to John Forbes, a senior advisor at the American Chamber of Commerce at the Philippines, increasing car sales and lack of mass transit and highways cause most traffic congestion, and was feared to make Metro Manila "uninhabitable" by 2020. A TomTom Traffic Index report in 2024 cited Metro Manila as having the worst traffic in the world for a metropolitan area.

Daily economic losses due to traffic congestion costs about ₱3 billion, as of 2012. By 2030, over ₱6 billion would be foregone everyday in the country' economy due to traffic congestion, according to JICA.

=== Air pollution ===
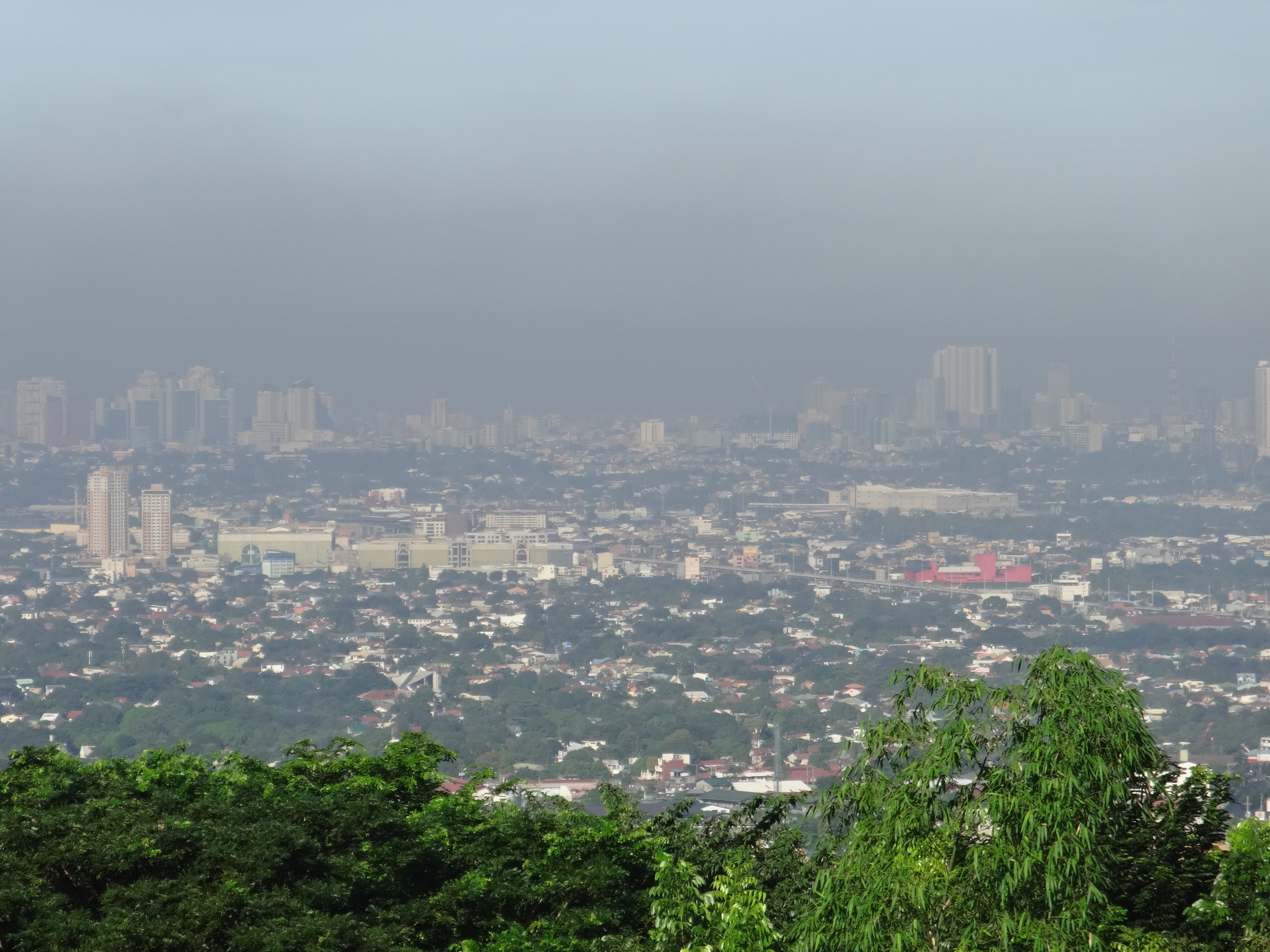
Smog over Metro Manila in 2019

There are around 270,000 franchised jeepney units on the road across the country, with some 75,000 units in Metro Manila alone. With the country's fast development and economic growth, old-model jeepneys have become the main contributor to air pollution in the cities. According to the Manila Aerosol Characterization Experiment (MACE 2015) study, diesel-powered jeepneys, which account for 20% of the total vehicle fleet, are responsible for 94% of the soot particle mass in Metro Manila.

According to the President of Partnership for Clean Air Rene Pineda, the issue stems from overpopulation, since more vehicles on the roads increases road congestion, and high-rise buildings and infrastructure means air pollution gets trapped on the ground instead of dispersing.

According to the World Bank, land transport in the Philippines contributed 25 million tons of carbon dioxide equivalent in 2020.

== See also ==
- Transportation in Metro Manila
- Transportation in Metro Cebu
- Traffic in Metro Manila
- Department of Transportation
- Department of Public Works and Highways
- List of bus companies of the Philippines
- Taxis of the Philippines
- Public Utility Vehicle Modernization Program
- Automotive industry in the Philippines
- Cycling in the Philippines
