= P2V =

P2V can refer to:

- Lockheed P-2 Neptune, a maritime patrol and anti-submarine warfare aircraft
- Physical-to-Virtual, on a virtualized computer platform

== See also ==
- PV2 (disambiguation)
