= PSSS =

PSSS may refer to:

== Groups, organizations ==
- PSSS Situbondo (Persatuan Sepakbola Seluruh Situbondo), a football club based in Situbondo, East Java, Indonesia
- Platform-Specific Services Segment, Future Airborne Capability Environment, The Open Group; a technical committee for avionics on military aviation platforms of the U.S.
- Planetary Science Summer School, Jet Propulsion Laboratory, Cresenta Valley, California, USA

== Linguistics ==
- psss, a cross-linguistic onomatopoeia, the sound of steam hissing
- psss, an elimination communication, for urination

== Other uses ==
- parallel, not sequential, spread spectrum (PSSS), a technology that is part of IEEE 802.15.4
- parallel-sequence spread spectrum (PSSS), a technology that is part of IEEE 802.15.4a
- Pre-season supplemental selection, a type of sports draft
- Psss, a 1974 stageplay by Alfonso Vallejo

== See also ==
- PPPS (disambiguation)
- PSS (disambiguation) for singular of PSSs
- PS3 (disambiguation)
- P3S
- PS (disambiguation)
