= PS-10 =

PS-10, PS 10, PS.10, PS10, may refer to:

== Places ==
- PS10 solar power plant (PS10; Spanish: Planta Solar 10, lit. 'Solar Plant 10'), Andalusia, Spain
- PS-10 Larkana-I, Sindh, Pakistan; a constituency in the Provincial Assembly of Sindh
- Constituency PS-10 (Shikarpur -II), Sindh, Pakistan; a former constituency in the Provincial Assembly of Sindh
- Ngardmau (FIPS code PS10), Babeldaob, Palau; see List of FIPS region codes (P–R)

== Vehicular ==
- CSA PS-10 "Tourer", a Czech light sport airplane
- Paul Schmitt P.S.10, a French WW1 biplane bomber
- Santana PS-10 "Anibal", a Spanish 4x4 utility vehicle

== Religion ==
- Psalm 10 (Ps. 10) the 10th psalm in the Book of Psalms, according to Masoretic or Hebrew numbering
- Psalm 11, the 10th psalm (Ps 10) in the Book of Psalms, according to Greek Septuagint or Latin Vulgate numbering

== Other uses ==
- Paul Stanley PS-10, a variant of the Ibanez Iceman electric guitar
- NORBIT PS10 Pulse Shaper, a digital logic module

== See also ==
- PS1 (disambiguation)
- PS (disambiguation)
