= BCSS =

BCSS may refer to:

== Schools and schooling ==
Secondary schools

- Bear Creek Secondary School, a high school located in Barrie, Ontario, Canada
- Bernie Custis Secondary School, a high school located in Hamilton, Ontario, Canada
- Bill Crothers Secondary School, a high school located in Markham, Canada
- Boundary Central Secondary School, a high school in Midway, British Columbia
- Brampton Centennial Secondary School, a high school in Brampton, Ontario

Schooling

- British Columbia School Sports
- Bergen County Special Services School District, a school district in Bergen County, New Jersey
- Buford City School System, a.k.a., Buford City School District, Gwinnett County, Georgia

== Other uses ==
- Behavioral change support system
- between-cluster sum of squares, in K-means clustering
- Bigelow Commercial Space Station
- Bihar Chhatra Sangharsh Samiti, one of the organizations in the Bihar Movement
- British Cactus & Succulent Society
- British Columbia Sheriff Service
- Business Class Services Specialist, see List of professional designations in the United States

== See also ==
- BCSS Namur
- BCS (disambiguation)
