= 3PS =

3PS may refer to:

- Three Principles Psychology (3Ps)
- Pause, Prompt, Praise (3Ps) in teaching reading
- pain, pee, poo (3Ps), see List of medical mnemonics § Delirium
- proven AND probable AND possible (3Ps) status for proven reserves of fossil fuels
- Triplet state (^{3}PS^{*}) in antimicrobial photodynamic therapy
- Airtronics Caliber 3PS from Sanwa Electronic
- 3P+S from Processor Technology, an Input/Output Module for the S100 expansion bus

== See also ==
- P3S
- PS3 (disambiguation)
- PPPS (disambiguation)
- PS (disambiguation)
- 3P (disambiguation) for the singular of 3Ps
