= PSS =

PSS may refer to:

== Businesses and organizations ==
=== Government and military organizations ===
- Palestinian Security Services, the armed forces and intelligence agencies of the State of Palestine
- Parliament Security Services, in charge of providing security to the Parliament of India
- Presidential Security Service (South Korea), a South Korean close protection agency

=== Political parties ===
- Sammarinese Socialist Party (Italian: Partito Socialista Sammarinese), San Marino
- Senegalese Socialist Party (French: Parti Socialiste Sénégalais)
- Strength of Serbia Movement (Pokret snaga Srbije), a political party in Serbia

=== Schools ===
==== Canada ====
- Parkland Secondary School, North Saanich, Victoria, British Columbia
- Penetanguishene Secondary School, Simcoe County District School Board, Ontario
- Penticton Secondary School, Penticton, British Columbia
- Pinetree Secondary School, Coquitlam, British Columbia
- Parkview Secondary School, Hamilton, Ontario

==== Elsewhere ====
- Park Secondary School, Dudley, West Midlands
- Popatlal Secondary School, Tanga, Tanzania

=== Other businesses and organizations ===
- Price Stern Sloan, a publishing imprint of Penguin
- Product Support Services, a Microsoft business unit
- PSS World Medical, an American distributor of medical products, equipment, billing services and pharmaceuticals
- Pakistan Statistical Society, an academic and professional society of statisticians
- Społem or PSS Społem, a Polish consumers' co-operative of local grocery stores
- PSS (UK), a British social care charity
- Personal Software Services, a defunct British video game publisher

== Science and technology ==
=== Biology and medicine ===
- Perceived Stress Scale, an instrument for measuring perceived stress in humans
- Porcine stress syndrome, a condition in pigs
- Portosystemic shunt, a disease found in humans, cats and dogs
- Progressive systemic sclerosis, a rare chronic disease
- Psychosocial short stature, a growth disorder that is caused by extreme stress

=== Computing ===
- Packet Switch Stream, a British packet-switched network
- Packet switching, a method of grouping data that is transmitted over a digital network into packets
- Panorama Software Sys-On-Line
- Passenger service system, systems used by airlines to manage reservations, inventory and check-in
- Performance supervision system, a software system used to improve the performance of a process plant
- Physical symbol system, a hypothesis in artificial intelligence research
- Power system simulator for engineering (PSS®E or PSS/E), software to simulate electrical power transmission networks
- Probabilistic signature scheme, a secure way of creating signatures with RSA
- Proportional set size, a measure of computer program memory use

=== Physics and chemistry ===
- Periodic steady-state analysis, type of simulation
- Physica Status Solidi, a family of academic journals focused on solid state physics
- Photostationary state, the equilibrium chemical composition under a specific kind of electromagnetic irradiation
- Plasma sound source, a means of making sonar underwater
- Polystyrene sulfonic acid, also known as sodium polystyrene sulfonate or poly(styrenesulfonate)
- Practical Salinity Scale, the conductivity ratio of a sea water sample to a standard KCl solution

=== Other uses in technology ===
- PSS silent pistol, a Soviet-designed silent handgun
- PortaSound PSS series, a series of portable Yamaha keyboards
- Power scale soaring, a form of radio controlled model flying
- Power system stabilizer, in power generation; see Wide-area damping control

== Sports teams and stadia ==
- Paikiasothy Saravanamuttu Stadium, Colombo, Sri Lanka
- Philippine Sports Stadium, Bocaue, Philippines
- PFC Septemvri Sofia, a Bulgarian football club
- Porvoon Salibandyseura, a Finnish sports club
- PSS Sleman, an Indonesian football club

== Other uses ==
- Kaulong language (ISO 639:pss), an Austronesian language
- Libertador General José de San Martín Airport (IATA code PSS), Posadas, Misiones, Argentina
- Player Search System, how Pokémon X and Y players can connect to each other around the world
- Project SuperStar (abbreviated PSS), a Singaporean singing reality-competition franchise
- Product-service system, a system of consumer access to products, as an alternative to personal product ownership
- Psalms, a book of the Hebrew Bible
- PSS, a ship prefix meaning Palau State Ship
- PSS-line, a fortified defense line in Finland during World War II; see Battle of Nietjärvi
