= PS2 (disambiguation) =

The PlayStation 2 is a sixth-generation video game console manufactured by Sony.

PS2, PS-2, Ps 2 or PS/2 may also refer to:

== Technology ==
- IBM Personal System/2, IBM's second generation of personal computers
- PS/2 port, a 6-pin Mini-DIN connector used for connecting some keyboards and mice to a PC compatible computer system

== Video games ==
- Phantasy Star II, a console role-playing video game developed by Sega AM7
- PlanetSide 2, a massively multiplayer online first-person-shooter video game
- Pokémon Stadium 2, a video game for the Nintendo 64
- Power Stone 2, a multiplayer fighting game for the Sega Dreamcast

== Other ==
- Psalm 2
- pS2 gene, is a gene in humans that encodes the Trefoil factor 1 protein
- Franklin PS-2, an American, high-wing, strut-braced, single seat glider
- Photosystem II, the first protein complex in the Light-dependent reactions
- PS 2, the name of several public elementary schools in New York City
- Ps_{2}, the chemical formula for di-positronium
- Patrick Surtain II, cornerback who plays for the Denver Broncos of the National Football League
- Ponniyin Selvan: II or PS II, a 2023 Indian Tamil-language historical epic film by Mani Ratnam

== See also ==
- PS1 (disambiguation)
- PS3 (disambiguation)
- Ponniyin Selvan (disambiguation)
