= PlayStation (disambiguation) =

PlayStation is a gaming brand of home video game consoles and associated products from Sony Interactive Entertainment.

PlayStation may also refer to:

== Video game consoles ==
- PlayStation (console) (PSX or PS1), the first console in the series
- PlayStation 2 (PS2), the second console in the series
- PlayStation 3 (PS3), the third console in the series
- PlayStation 4 (PS4), the fourth console in the series
- PlayStation 5 (PS5), the fifth console in the series
- PlayStation Classic, a miniaturized PS1 dedicated console with 20 included games
- PlayStation Portable (PSP), a handheld console
- PlayStation Vita, a successor to the PSP
- PSX (digital video recorder), a PlayStation 2-based digital video recorder
- Nintendo PlayStation, an unreleased hybrid console

== Other meanings ==
- PlayStation Productions, a film production company owned by Sony
- PlayStation Experience (PSX), an annual event for the video game industry
- Portable Sound Format or PlayStation Sound Format, a music file format
- PlayStation (yacht), a racing catamaran

== See also ==
- PlayStation Magazine (disambiguation)
