= Kaveri (disambiguation) =

Kaveri may refer to:

== People ==
- Kaveri (actress), Indian actress
- Kaveri (Tamil actress), Indian actress in Tamil cinema
- Kaveri Jha (born 1980), Telugu and Hindi actress
- Kaveri Kaul, film director
- Kaveri Nambisan, Indian novelist
- Kaveri Kachari, head of the women's wing of the banned outfit ULFA

== Films ==
- Kaveri (1955 film), a 1955 Tamil-language film directed by D. Yoganand
- Kaveri (1975 film), a 1975 Kannada-language film directed by H. N. Reddy
- Kaveri (1986 film), a 1986 Malayalam-language film directed by Rajeevnath
- Kaveri Amma, a fictional character in the 2004 Indian film Swades, played by Kishori Ballal
- Kaveri Amma, a fictional policewoman played by Riddhi Dogra in the 2023 Indian film Jawan

== Other uses ==
- Kaveri River, one of the major rivers of India
- Kaveri River (Madhya Pradesh), a smaller river in central India
- GTRE GTX-35VS Kaveri, a turbofan aircraft engine
- Kaveri palam, a bridge in Trichy, Tamil Nadu, India
- Kaveri Express, a daily train running between Mysore and Chennai in India
- Kaveri, a hardware platform from AMD featuring the Steamroller microarchitecture

== See also ==
- Ponni (disambiguation), another name of the river
