= National Program Office =

Former office in United States Government

Agency overview
- Formed: 14 September 1982
- Dissolved: 1994
- Headquarters: Crystal City, Virginia
- Agency executive: Bennett L. Lewis, Director

The National Program Office (NPO) was an office of the United States Government, established to ensure continuity of government in the event of a national disaster. The NPO was established by a secret executive order (National Security Decision Directive 55) signed on 14 September 1982 by President Ronald Reagan during the Cold War in preparation for a nuclear war, presumably with the Soviet Union.

The NPO plan was classified as Top Secret, codeword Pegasus. It was also referred to as Project 908 (also known as "Nine Naught Eight"). Oversight of the NPO was limited to the Project Pegasus committee, chaired by then-vice president George H. W. Bush. The committee included the chairman of the Joint Chiefs of Staff (or his deputy), FBI director William H. Webster, Attorney General Edwin Meese III and other top cabinet officials. The action officer for the project was Marine Lieutenant Colonel Oliver North, who then worked at the National Security Council under retired Marine Lieutenant Colonel Robert McFarlane.

== Background ==
On June 30, 1980, President Jimmy Carter signed Presidential Directive 58 (PD-58), which directed the establishment of a Joint Program Office to provide Continuity of Government for the presidency.

== Organization ==
=== Disaster preparedness ===
The FBI played a critical role in Project 908: selection and analysis of locations throughout the United States for use during and after a crisis. Agreements were made with various businesses for leasing of space and resources (i.e. power and water) for use by the U.S. government during the crisis period.

=== Survivable communications ===
Most of the money was used to design and build relocatable communications vans that would be activated if there was a threat of nuclear war. The rationale for relocatable vans was that the National Military Command Center (NMCC) at the Pentagon and the Alternate National Military Command Center (ANMCC) located in the Raven Rock Mountain Complex were already targeted by the Soviet Union and therefore would not survive a nuclear strike. The same criticism could not be leveled at the Boeing E-4 aircraft that made up the National Emergency Airborne Command Posts (NEACP), but the plan for relocatable communications vans went forward nevertheless.

The government agency that was the strongest advocate for relocatable vans was the Defense Communications Agency (DCA), since renamed the Defense Information Systems Agency (DISA), whose responsibility it was to plan for continuity of military communications despite the possible loss of both land and satellite-based links. This necessitated the development of alternatives that would be independent of both landlines and land-based radio systems, and also satellites, all of which were thought to be possibly subject to destruction or impairment in an all-out war. The alternatives needed to be capable of being relocated, perhaps frequently, and set up rapidly in a new location when necessary. Since the facts of nuclear warfare also seemed to indicate that High Frequency (HF) Radio propagation might be disturbed by unfamiliar nuclear effects, this led to the consideration of exotic technologies such as troposcatter and meteor burst communication links. Such systems, while effective, used relatively small antennas and could indeed be transported efficiently and economically in relocatable vans.

=== Facilities ===
The Federal Reserve established Mount Pony under the NPO where billions of dollars in currency was stored in a hardened bunker. The cash was to be used to restart the economy east of the Mississippi River in case of a nuclear war. The facility also housed the central switching center for the Federal Reserve's Fedwire system until 1988 when all money was removed, switching was decentralized, and the site deactivated as an NPO facility.

== Cover ==
The NPO was organized in the mid-1980s under a retired Army Lieutenant General, and funded in an initial amount of $2.7 billion in so-called black money. The NPO set up offices at 400 Army-Navy Drive in the Crystal City section of Arlington, Virginia. The NPO recruited communications specialists and retired military officers to do staff work. It was known as the Defense Mobilization Systems Planning Activity (DMSPA), a cover organization. A special security compartment named CHALIS was established for classified documents, which were distributed with a yellow stripe down the right border.

== Disestablishment ==
President Bill Clinton attempted to dismantle the NPO during his tenure in the White House; he cancelled Project 908 and declassified it. However, those efforts proved incomplete when the legacy NPO plan for Continuity of Government was briefly activated by President George W. Bush on September 11, 2001, in response to the terrorist attacks on New York City and Washington, DC.

The relocatable communications vans that had already been built were put under the command of the U. S. Army's 11th Signal Brigade at Fort Huachuca, Arizona. Similarly equipped trucks are presently within the inventory of the Federal Emergency Management Agency (FEMA), called Multi-Radio Vans.

== Military counterpart ==
The military analog was the Strategic Air Command's (SAC) Headquarters Emergency Relocation Team (HERT)). Later evolving in the 55th Mobile Command and Control Squadron, the unit's purpose was to provide command and control to United States nuclear forces in the event of a national emergency (i.e. nuclear war), and relocation or destruction of SAC Headquarters at Offutt AFB, Nebraska.

== See also ==
- National Audio-Visual Conservation Center at Mount Pony, Culpeper, Virginia
- Headquarters Emergency Relocation Team
- 55th Mobile Command and Control Squadron
- 153d Mobile Command and Control Squadron
