= Headquarters Emergency Relocation Team =

Coordinates: 41.116°N 95.911°W

Headquarters Emergency Relocation Team (HERT) was a subordinate unit to the United States' Strategic Air Command (SAC) during the Cold War, poised to provide command and control (C2) of SAC forces in the event of a national emergency (i.e. nuclear war). The personnel and equipment were stationed at Offutt Air Force Base, Nebraska, with temporary deployment locations at the Cornhusker Army Ammunition Plant, Grand Island, Nebraska.

== History ==
The term HERT was superseded by Enduring Battle Management Support Center (EBMSC) circa 1982. The unit was redesignated 55th Mobile Command and Control Squadron after SAC was inactivated in 1992.

== Chronology ==
- 1970: OPLAN 109 for HERT is first developed. Mostly a paper exercise, OPLAN 109 was revised in 1974, 1975, 1977.
- June 1979: participation in exercise GLOBAL SHIELD
- April 1980: participation in exercise PRIZE GAUNTLET
- June 1980: participation in exercise GLOBAL SHIELD
- January 1981: participation in exercise GLOBAL SHIELD
- June 1982: participation in exercise GLOBAL SHIELD
- June 1983: participation in exercise GLOBAL SHIELD
- Jan 1984: participation in local Offutt AFB exercises
- Apr 1984: participation in exercise NIGHT TRAIN 84, alongside Rex 84

== Weather support ==
The 3d Weather Wing (3 WW) was tasked to support HERT. 3 WW developed nuclear fallout procedures for Post Attack Command and Control System (PACCS), and demonstrated Defense Meteorological Support Program (DMSP) Mark IV capabilities. Weather support centered around DMSP satellite data, local observations, climographic data and aircraft forwarded "air reports" (AIREPS). Future capabilities were to rely on Marine HF broadcast data.

== Interaction with NPO ==
As the National Program Office (NPO) mirrored HERTs command and control abilities for the civilian side of the government, coordination between the two were exercised during exercise NIGHT TRAIN 84, which was held concurrent with READINESS EXERCISE 84 (REX 84).

== See also ==
- Post-Attack Command and Control System
- Continuity of government
- 55th Mobile Command and Control Squadron
