= Ponniyin Selvan (disambiguation) =

Ponniyin Selvan (lit. 'Son of Ponni (Kaveri) River', PS) is an Indian Tamil-language historical novel written by Kalki Krishnamurthy.

Ponniyin Selvan may also refer to its various adaptations:

- Ponniyin Selvan: I or PS I, a 2022 Indian Tamil-language film by Mani Ratnam
  - Ponniyin Selvan: I (soundtrack), a soundtrack album by A. R. Rahman for the film
- Ponniyin Selvan: II or PS II, a 2023 sequel to Ponniyin Selvan: I, also by Mani Ratnam
  - Ponniyin Selvan: II (soundtrack), a soundtrack album by A. R. Rahman for the film
- Production of Ponniyin Selvan: I and Ponniyin Selvan: II, about the production of the films
- Ponniyin Selvan (Original Score), a film score album by A. R. Rahman for the films
- Ponniyin Selvan (web series), an unreleased Indian Tamil-language web series

== See also ==
- PS (disambiguation)
- PS1 (disambiguation)
- PS2 (disambiguation)
- Ponni (disambiguation)
- Ponniyin Selvan (2005 film), an Indian Tamil-language film by Radha Mohan, unrelated to the novel
