= Bernie Custis Secondary School =

Canadian public secondary school

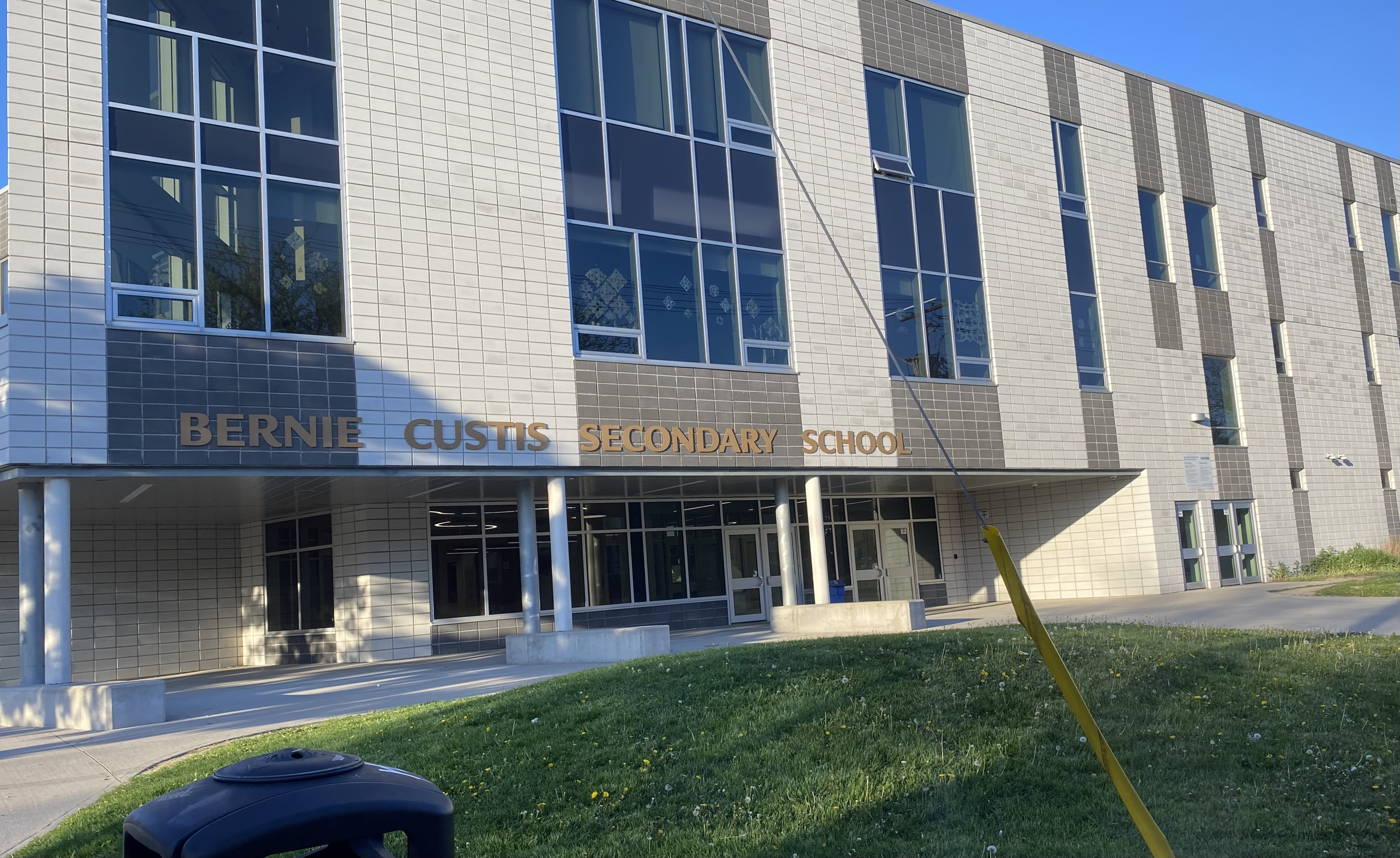

Location
- 1055 King Street East; Hamilton, Ontario, L8M 1E2; Canada; 43°15′01″N 79°49′54″W

Information
- School type: Public, secondary school
- Opened: September 2019; 7 years ago
- School board: Hamilton-Wentworth District School Board
- Superintendent: Michelle Lemaire
- Area trustee: Maria Felix Miller
- School number: 898848
- Principal: Geeta Malhotra
- Grades: 9–12
- Enrolment: 1,035 (2021–22)
- Campus type: Urban
- Colours: Red and yellow
- Nickname: Tigers
- Feeder schools: Adelaide Hoodless Elementary School; Cathy Wever Elementary School; Dr. J. Edgar Davey Elementary School; Memorial Elementary School; Prince of Wales Elementary School; Queen Victoria Elementary School
- Website: www.hwdsb.on.ca/berniecustis/

Bernie Custis Secondary School (BCSS) is a public secondary school in Hamilton, Ontario. It is a part of the Hamilton-Wentworth District School Board and is located in the Stipley neighbourhood. The school opened in September 2019 on the site of the former Scott Park Secondary School. It services much of Hamilton’s downtown and east end areas, absorbing catchments that were previously serviced by Delta Secondary School and Sir John A. Macdonald Secondary School, both of which closed in June 2019, and Parkview Secondary School, which closed in 2014. The school was named in honour of Canadian Football Hall of Fame player and coach Bernie Custis, who was a local teacher and principal.

== History ==
In 1912, the City of Hamilton bought the property that currently includes BCSS, Bernie Morelli Recreation Centre, Jimmy Thompson Memorial Pool, and Tim Hortons Field from lawyer and businessman John J. Scott. Scott intended for the land to be used as a park, and approached the city multiple times about selling. In 1915, the property was transferred to the parks board, and it became known as Scott Park. Also in 1912, King George Elementary School opened on the outskirts of the future Scott Park, the first of five schools that would be located within or just outside the property. Prince of Wales Elementary School opened in 1921, followed by Scott Park Secondary in 1966, and Parkview shortly after.

=== Scott Park Secondary School ===
Scott Park Secondary School was a public secondary school located in Hamilton, Ontario. It was a part of the Hamilton-Wentworth District School Board and opened in 1966. The school closed in 2001, and sat vacant until its demolition in 2015. It was initially sold by the school board after its closure, but was expropriated in 2013 with the intention of using the property as the parking lot for the future Bernie Custis Secondary School. The new school was eventually built on the property.

=== 2012–2019 ===
In 2012, the HWDSB voted to close eight secondary schools, including Delta, Sir John A. Macdonald, and Parkview. In October 2013, the board then voted to build a new high school on the site of Parkview and neighbouring King George schools, with a parking lot on the property housing the vacant Scott Park school down the street. Construction was initially scheduled to be completed by 2015.

The plans stalled for two years as King George underwent a heritage designation evaluation. In 2015, the former elementary school’s heritage designation was approved, leading to alternate plans being drawn up to build the new school on the smaller Scott Park site.

Delta and Sir John A. Macdonald schools remained open until construction of Bernie Custis Secondary was completed in 2019. The school opened that September, and became the first new high school to open in the downtown Hamilton area in over 50 years.

=== 2019–present ===
In 2023, students and community members petitioned the school board to address the lack of a sports field at BCSS. The school was the only public high school in the city without a football field, which students pointed out with a social media campaign. The petition gathered 370 signatures, the majority being students.

The lack of outdoor recreational space was the primary reason why the original plan was to build the school on the King George/Parkview property. When the HWDSB had to change the plan, they attempted to mitigate the problem by coordinating with the city to building a neighbouring recreation centre and purchasing a nearby commercial property to build a park on. They also negotiated with Tim Hortons Field to provide access to the facility for use by the school’s sports teams, but most of the field’s availability is during the summer months and the hours allocated are not available to physical education classes. The development of the nearby park had been delayed until 2025 due to environmental assessment findings.

In August 2023, landscaping work was performed to remove berms from the area between the school and Bernie Morelli Recreation Centre, providing a small field for school use.

== See also ==
- Education in Ontario
- List of secondary schools in Ontario
- Nora Frances Henderson Secondary School
