= Presidential Successor Support System =

United States continuity of government program

The Presidential Successor Support System (PSSS or PS-cubed) is part of the United States' Continuity of Government (COG) programs. Considered one of many "black programs," (i.e. Special Access Programs), very few details have come to light about it. PSSS was run by the National Program Office.

The National Program Office was established in 1982, by National Security Decision Directive 55, Enduring National Leadership.

Prior presidential administrations had different ways of dealing with the problem of leadership decapitation. President Eisenhower designated ten captains of industry to take control of war-time organizations to help the country reconstitute itself. The existence of the Eisenhower Ten was accidentally found by the incoming John F. Kennedy administration in 1961.
