= PPPS =

PPPS may refer to:

- in a document, a post-post-postscript
- Pakistan Peoples Party–Sherpao ("PPP–S" or "PPP(S)"), a political party in Pakistan
- People's Press Printing Society, the publishers of the British Morning Star newspaper
- Prior Park Preparatory School, a former Roman Catholic independent school in Cricklade, England, UK
- Positive Pressure Personnel Suit. a whole body personal protective suit designed to prevent contamination from outside
- Pulitzer Prize for Public Service, annual journalistic excellency award
- Paw Paw Public Schools, Michigan, USA

== See also ==
- P3S
- 3PS (disambiguation)
- PS (disambiguation)
- PPP (disambiguation) for the singular of PPPs
