= P.S. I Love You =

P.S. I Love You may refer to:

== Literature ==
- PS, I Love You (novel), a 2004 novel by Cecelia Ahern
- P.S. I Love You, a devotional book by H. Jackson Brown, Jr.
- P.S. I Love You: An Intimate Portrait of Peter Sellers, a biography by Michael Sellers

== Film and television ==
- U.S. productions:
  - P.S. I Luv U (1991), detective TV series
  - P.S. I Love You (film) (2007), based on the Cecelia Ahern novel
  - "P.S. I Love You" (How I Met Your Mother) (2013), episode on TV
- Filipino productions (featuring Gabby Concepcion):
  - P. S. I Love You (1981), film featuring Sharon Cuneta
  - P. S. I Love You (TV series) (2011–2012), sequel to the film

== Music ==
- PS I Love You (band), a Canadian indie-rock band

=== Albums ===
- PS I Love You (album), a 2000 album by Kid 606

=== Songs ===
- "P.S. I Love You" (1934 song), a 1934 song by Johnny Mercer and Gordon Jenkins
- "P.S. I Love You" (Beatles song), a 1962 song by The Beatles
- "P.S. I Love U" (Gackt song), a 2014 Japanese song by Gackt
- "P.S. I Love You" (Robin Daggers song), a 2013 song by Robin Daggers from the television series How I Met Your Mother
- "P.S. I Love You", a song by Curtis Mayfield from the 1976 album Give, Get, Take and Have
- "P.S. I Love You", a song by Philippines' Sharon Cuneta
- "P.S. I Love You", a song by Hins Cheung, a Chinese singer
- "P.S. I Love You", a song by Supper Moment, a Hong Kong band
- "Chocolate Salty Balls (P.S. I Love You)", a 1998 song from the TV series South Park

== Games ==
- Puffy: P.S. I Love You, a 1999 video game for PlayStation starring Japanese rock stars Puffy AmiYumi

== See also ==
- PS (disambiguation)
