= Tanga Secondary Education Society =

Tanga Secondary Education Society now known Tanga Education Society, is an organization based in Tanga, Tanzania. It was formed in 1966 with a mandate to oversee the project of constructing the private secondary school and run the management of this school. In succession it now also oversees a Nursery and Primary School.
