= PS1 =

PS1, Ps 1, PS-1, PS/1 or PS One may refer to:

== Arts and entertainment ==
- MoMA PS1 (derived from "Public School One"), American contemporary art institution
- Ponniyin Selvan: I or PS I, a 2022 Indian Tamil language period action-drama film by Mani Ratnam
  - Ponniyin Selvan: I (soundtrack), its soundtrack album by A. R. Rahman

== Technology ==
- "$PS1", "Prompt String 1" a shell variable in a command-line interface which specifies the command prompt
- IBM PS/1, IBM Personal System/1 series of home computers
- Pan-STARRS' first telescope, called PS1
- PostScript Type 1 font
- Prosteyshiy Sputnik 1, the first artificial Earth satellite
- .ps1, the extension of a Microsoft PowerShell script file

== Video gaming ==
- PlayStation (console), video game console released by Sony in 1994
  - PS One (console), a miniature version of the original PlayStation released in 2000
- Phantasy Star (video game), the first in the Phantasy Star series
- PlanetSide (video game), the first in the PlanetSide MMOFPS video game series

== Other uses ==
- Photosystem I, the second photosystem in the photosynthetic light reactions of plants
- The name and designation for several public schools in the New York City Department of Education; see List of public elementary schools in New York City
- Psalm 1 from the Judeo-Christian Book of Psalms
- The boxcar in the PS line of post-war standardized freight cars from Pullman-Standard

== See also ==
- PS2 (disambiguation)
- PS (disambiguation)
- Ponniyin Selvan (disambiguation)
