= Ponni =

Ponni may refer to:

- Ponni, another name for the Kaveri River in southern India
  - Ponni rice, a variety of rice cultivated in India
- Ponni (novel), a 1967 Malayalam-language novel by Indian writer Malayattoor
  - Ponni (1976 film), an Indian film by Thoppil Bhasi, based on the novel
- Ponni (1953 film), an Indian Tamil-language film
- Ponni (TV series), an Indian Tamil-language serial
- Põnni, a village in Võru County, Estonia

== See also ==
- Ponniyin Selvan (disambiguation), literally "son of Ponni River", an Indian media franchise
- Kaveri (disambiguation)
