= PS =

P.S. commonly refers to:

- Postscript, writing added after the main body of a letter

PS, P.S., or ps may also refer to:

== Arts, entertainment and media ==
=== Literature ===
- PS Publishing, based in the UK
- PS Magazine, a U.S. Army magazine
- Popular Science, a U.S. magazine
- PlayStation Magazine (disambiguation)

=== Music ===
- PS Classics, a record label
- P.S. (album), a compilation album of film music by Goran Bregovic
- P.S. (A Toad Retrospective), a compilation album of music by Toad The Wet Sprocket
- "PS", 2003 song by The Books from the album The Lemon of Pink
- "P.S.", 1993 song by James from the album Laid

=== Stage and screen ===
- P.S. (film), a 2004 film
- P.S., a 2010 film by Yalkin Tuychiev
- PS (TV series), a German television series
- Prompt corner or prompt side, an area of a stage
- P.S. (Doctor Who), a mini episode of the seventh series of Doctor Who

=== Other media ===
- PlayStation, a video gaming brand owned by Sony
- PlayStation (console), a home video game console by Sony
- Ponniyin Selvan (disambiguation), Indian media franchise, abbreviated PS

== Honors ==
- iPhrothiya yeSiliva, a South African military award
- Padma Shri, an Indian civilian award

== Language ==
- Pashto language (ISO 639:ps)
- Proto-Semitic language, a hypothesized proto-language
- The sound of Greek letter psi (ψ)

== Places ==
- Palau (FIPS PUB 10-4 territory code PS)
- State of Palestine (ISO 3166 country code PS)
- MoMA PS1, an art institution in New York

== Politics ==
- PS – Political Science & Politics, academic journal
- Parti Socialiste (disambiguation), French
- Partido Socialista (disambiguation), Spanish and Portuguese
- Partito Socialista (disambiguation), Italian
- Polizia di Stato, Italian national police force
- Positive Slovenia
- Pradeshiya Sabha, a unit of local government in Sri Lanka
- Progressive Slovakia Progresívne Slovensko
- Social Democratic Party (Andorra) Partit Socialdemòcrata
- Socialist Party (Netherlands)
- Socialist Party of Albania Partia Socialiste
- Socialist Party of Chile Partido Socialista de Chile
- Socialist Party of Romania Partidul Socialist [din România]
- Finns Party Perussuomalaiset
- Movement of Socialists (Pokret socijalista), a political party in Serbia

== Religion ==
- Pastors, ministers in some Christian churches
- Psalms, a book in the Tanakh and Christian Bibles

== Science and technology ==
=== Units of measurement ===
- Petasecond (Ps), 10^{15} seconds
- Picosecond (ps), 10^{−12} seconds
- Pferdestärke (PS), abbreviation of the German term for metric horsepower
- Picosiemens (pS), SI unit of electric conductance

=== Computing ===
- Adobe Photoshop, a graphics editor and creator by Adobe
- MPEG program stream, an MPEG-2 container format
- Parametric Stereo, feature used in digital audio
- PostScript, a page description language
  - .ps, filename extension for a file in PostScript format
- PowerShell, a command line scripting and system management shell for Microsoft Windows
- ps (Unix), an application that displays statistics on running processes
- .ps, Palestinian Internet domain extension or top-level domain (ccTLD)
- PS Power and Sample Size, an interactive computer program for power and sample size calculations

=== Medicine ===
- Panayiotopoulos syndrome, a childhood seizure disorder
- Progeroid syndromes, a group of rare diseases causing premature aging
- Pulmonary stenosis or pulmonic stenosis, obstruction of the pulmonary artery of the heart

=== Physics and chemistry ===
- P_{s} or static pressure, in fluid mechanics and aviation
- Proton Synchrotron, a 1959 particle accelerator at CERN
- Chloropicrin, a highly toxic chemical compound
- Persulfate, a class of peroxide sulfate used as a powerful oxidizing agent
- Phosphatidylserine, a phospholipid
- Phosphorothioate (or thiophosphate), a family of compounds and anions with the general chemical formula PS_{4−x}O_{x}^{3−} (x = 0, 1, 2, or 3)
- Polystyrene, a common type of plastic
- Ps, positronium, pseudo-chemical symbol

== Transportation ==
- Paddle steamer, abbreviated PS in vessel prefixes
- Power Stage, a World Rally Championship special stage
- Power steering, a device that helps with steering vehicles
- Pacific Southwest Airlines (1949-1988), IATA designator of former airline
- Ukraine International Airlines, IATA airline designator since 1992
- South Papua (vehicle registration prefix PS)

== Other uses ==
- Planning Service, Department of the Environment (Northern Ireland)
- Plastic Surgery, abbreviated as P.S. for simple use
- Police sergeant
- Power supply
- Professional services, abbreviated P.S. in name suffixes
- State school or public school, in the US and other countries

== See also ==
- P.S. I Love You (disambiguation)
- PSS (disambiguation)
