= PS3 (disambiguation) =

The PlayStation 3 (PS3) is a video game console.

PS3 and variations thereof may also refer to:

== Products, items ==
- Phantasy Star III: Generations of Doom, a 1990 console role-playing video game
- Windows PowerShell, version 3
- Tupolev PS-3 airplane
- PS-3, an effects pedal by Boss Corporation

== Politics ==
- PS-3 Jacobabad-III, Jacobabad, Sindh, Pakistan; a constituency in the Sindh Provincial Assembly
- Former Constituency PS-3 (Sukkur-III), Sukkur, Sindh, Pakistan; a constituency in the Sindh Provincial Assembly
- Presidential Successor Support System (PS^{3}; PS-cubed), United States' Continuity of Government

== Other uses ==
- PostScript 3, a page description language developed by Adobe Systems
- DICOM (NEMA standard PS3) Digital Imaging and Communications in Medicine
- Psalm 3

== See also ==
- PS (disambiguation)
- P3S
