= Kaveri Palam =

Bridge in India

Coordinates: 10.839492°N 78.697257°E

Kaveri Palam is a bridge in Tiruchirapalli, Tamil Nadu, India.
