= PS Power and Sample Size =

PS Power and Sample Size Calculator
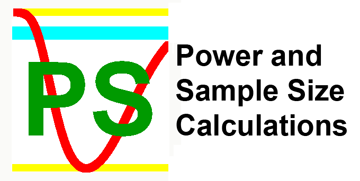
- Developer(s): W.D. Dupont & W.D. Plummer
- Stable release: 3.1.2 / August 2014
- Operating system: Windows. Also on Apple and Linux under Wine. Also available as an online tool.
- Type: Power & sample size calculations
- License: Creative Commons Attribution-NonCommercial-NoDerivs 3.0 United States License
- Website: GitHub

PS is an interactive computer program for performing statistical power and sample size calculations.

== Program description ==
The P program can be used for studies with dichotomous, continuous, or survival response measures. The user specifies the alternative hypothesis in terms of differing response rates, means, survival times, relative risks, or odds ratios. Matched or independent study designs may be used. Power, sample size, and the detectable alternative hypothesis are interrelated. The user specifies any two of these three quantities and the program derives the third. A description of each calculation, written in English, is generated and may be copied into the user's documents. Interactive help is available. The program provides methods that are appropriate for matched and independent t-tests, survival analysis, matched and unmatched studies of dichotomous events, the Mantel-Haenszel test, and linear regression. The program can generate graphs of the relationships between power, sample size and the detectable alternative hypothesis. It can plot graphs of any two of these variables while holding the third constant. Linear or logarithmic axes may be used and multiple curves can be plotted on each graph. Graphs may be copied and pasted into other documents or programs for further editing.

== Reviews ==
Reviews of this program have been published by McCrum-Gardner, Thomas and Krebs, Stawicki and Pezzullo.

== Web version ==
A web-based version of the program is also available at https://cqsclinical.app.vumc.org/ps/.
