= Constituency PS-10 (Shikarpur -II) =

Former constituency of the Provincial Assembly of Sindh, Pakistan

PS-10 Shikarpur -II
- Former constituency for the Provincial Assembly of Sindh

Former constituency
- Abolished: 2018
- Replaced by: PS-8 Shikarpur-II & PS-9 Shikarpur-III

PS-10 Shikarpur-II was a constituency of the Provincial Assembly of Sindh. It was abolished after 2018 Delimitations as Shikarpur District lost 1 seat in 2017 Census.

== See also ==
- Sindh
