= Parti Socialiste =

Parti Socialiste (Socialist Party) may refer to:

- Parti Socialiste (Belgium)
- Parti Socialiste (France)
- Parti Socialiste (Mauritius) (PS), see List of political parties in Mauritius
- Parti Socialiste Mauricien (PSM), see List of political parties in Mauritius
- Parti Socialiste du Sénégal, Senegal
- Parti Socialiste Suisse, Switzerland
- Partie Socialiste (Tunisia)

== See also ==
- List of socialist parties
