= Ponniyin Selvan (Original Score) =

2024 film score by A. R. Rahman

- Album cover

Film score by A. R. Rahman
- Released: January 6, 2024
- Recorded: 2019–2023
- Studio: Panchathan Record Inn and AM Studios, Chennai; KM Music Conservatory, Chennai; Panchathan Hollywood Studios, Los Angeles; Firdaus Studio, Dubai
- Length: 1:28:00
- Language: Tamil
- Label: Tips Music
- Producer: A. R. Rahman

Ponniyin Selvan (Original Score) is a film score album by A. R. Rahman, combining the film score from both films Ponniyin Selvan: I and Ponniyin Selvan: II into single album. The films directed by Mani Ratnam which features an ensemble cast of Vikram, Karthi, Jayam Ravi, Aishwarya Rai Bachchan, Trisha, Aishwarya Lekshmi, Sobhita Dhulipala, Prabhu, R. Sarathkumar, Vikram Prabhu, Jayaram, Prakash Raj, Rahman and R. Parthiban. Released on January 6, 2024, to coincide with Rahman's 57th birthday.

This collaboration between director Mani Ratnam and A. R. Rahman marks their 30th year working together.

== Release information ==
Ponniyin Selvan (Original Score) was officially released by A. R. Rahman through his Twitter account on January 6, 2024.

== Background ==
In collaboration with the Firdaus Orchestra, mentored by A. R. Rahman, the background score for Ponniyin Selvan: Original Score was created. A behind-the-scenes video released after Ponniyin Selvan: II showed the orchestra's role in the film. Rahman emphasized the film's exploration of Tamil culture and the Chola dynasty. The video featured scenes from the film, the recording process, and introduced sound engineer Simon Rhodes. The Firdaus Orchestra expressed gratitude for the opportunity, calling it an epic journey and congratulating the entire team.

== Background music ==
All lyrics are written by Ilango Krishnan.

Tamil
No.	Title	Artist(s)	Length
1.	"Armageddon"	A. R. Rahman	04:30
2.	"Arunmozhi’s Dilemma"	A. R. Rahman	01:52
3.	"Chozha’s Bravery"	A. R. Rahman	02:20
4.	"Conspiracy"	A. R. Rahman	03:47
5.	"Exotic Queen"	A. R. Rahman	01:44
6.	"Life at Lanka"	A. R. Rahman	01:49
7.	"Nandini’s Fortress"	A. R. Rahman	02:32
8.	"The Guardian Angel"	A. R. Rahman	01:05
9.	"The Pandiyan’s Oath"	A. R. Rahman	01:08
10.	"The Thirst for the Throne"	A. R. Rahman	01:16
11.	"The Wise King"	A. R. Rahman	01:44
12.	"VT’s Play"	A. R. Rahman	01:01
13.	"Oo Rey Sooriyare"	A. R. Rahman, Sunitha Sarathy & Ilango	01:45
14.	"Saaya Sanjale"	A. R. Rahman & Nakul Abhyankar	01:40
15.	"Soodanathu Rattham"	A. R. Rahman & Deepthi Suresh	02:52
16.	"Vanathi’s Message"	A. R. Rahman & Sivasri Skandaprasad	02:08
17.	"A New King is Born"	A. R. Rahman	02:00
18.	"Karikalan’s Remorse"	A. R. Rahman & Nabyla Maan	04:02
19.	"Karikalan’s Valour"	A. R. Rahman	01:30
20.	"Market Chase"	A. R. Rahman	02:35
21.	"Nandini's Inner Voice"	A. R. Rahman & Nabyla Maan	02:50
22.	"Pandyan’s Invade"	A. R. Rahman	02:23
23.	"Por Konda Puli - A Chozhan War Cry"	A. R. Rahman	03:24
24.	"PS vs VT"	A. R. Rahman	02:25
25.	"Requiem for the Fallen Monarch"	A. R. Rahman	04:00
26.	"The Confrontation"	A. R. Rahman	04:06
27.	"The Fall of Pandya"	A. R. Rahman	01:52
28.	"The Fangs of Love & Redemption"	A. R. Rahman & Madhura Dhara Talluri	08:23
29.	"The Saga Continues"	A. R. Rahman	02:44
30.	"The Silent Sovereign"	A. R. Rahman	01:27
31.	"The Trial"	A. R. Rahman	05:39
32.	"Vellum Vengai"	A. R. Rahman	02:17
33.	"War is Declared"	A. R. Rahman	01:59
34.	"Young Nandini & Karikalan"	A. R. Rahman	02:06
Total length:			1:28:00

== Album credits ==
- Music Label: Tips Music
- Lyrics: Ilango Krishnan, Kabilan, Siva Ananth & Krithika Nelson
- Music Composer: A. R. Rahman
- Re-Recording Mixer: Craig Mann
- Additional Re-Recording Mixer: S Sivakumar
- Sound Designer: Anand Krishnamoorthi
- Background Score Supervisor: Tuomas Kantelinen
- Music Supervisor: Nakul Abhyankar
- Shehnai : S. Ballesh, Krishna Ballesh
- Panchatan Sound Engineers: Suresh Permal, Karthik Sekaran & Aravind Crescendo
- Music Mix Engineer: Pradvay and Craig Penny
- Music Mastering: Suresh Permal
- Apple Digital Master: Riyasdeen Riyan
- Moroccan Vocals: Nabyla Maan
- "Oo Rey Sooriyare" Vocals: Sunitha Sarathy
- "Soodanathu Rattham" Vocals: Deepthi Suresh
- "Vanathi's Message" Vocals: Sivasri Skandaprasad
- "Saaya Sanjale" Vocals: Nakul Abhyankar
