= Product Support Services =

Product Support Services, more commonly referred to as PSS, is the Microsoft business unit with primary responsibility for responding to end-user and partner requests for assistance with the company's products and services.

== Feedback and product development ==
PSS also gives feedback to Microsoft development groups for use in the development of future products or product features. The Windows 2000 recovery console, for instance, was developed in large part to address difficulty that PSS agents had when attempting to assist customers with non-functional Windows NT installations. Additionally, PSS identifies major issues with products, and works with the responsible product teams in order to create "hotfixes" for these issues, and/or make sure that the issues are addressed in service packs or future product versions. It is a type of Call Center.

== Support options ==
PSS offers a wide variety of support options, with varying prices. Options include assistance with:

- Basic usage
- "Break-fix" support
- Security patch installation
- Onsite and offsite consulting

== Offices ==
PSS has major offices worldwide, including:

- Las Colinas, Texas, United States
- Issaquah, Washington, United States
- Charlotte, North Carolina, United States
- Embassy Golf Links, Bangalore, India

== See also ==
- Technical support
