= Partido Socialista =

Partido Socialista is Spanish and Portuguese for "Socialist Party". Used as a proper noun without any other adjectives, it may refer to:

- Socialist Party (Argentina)
- Socialist Party (Bolivia, 1971)
- Socialist Party of Chile
- Socialist Party (Guatemala)
- Socialist Party (Panama)
- Socialist Party (Peru)
- Socialist Party (Portugal)
- Socialist Party of Uruguay
- Partido Socialista de Puerto Rico
- Partido Socialista Puertorriqueño

== See also ==
- List of socialist parties
