= Periodic steady-state analysis =

Periodic Steady-State Analysis (PSS analysis) computes the periodic steady-state response of a circuit at a specified fundamental frequency, with a simulation time independent of the time constants of the circuit. The PSS analysis also determines the circuit's periodic operating point which is required starting point for the periodic time-varying small-signal analyses: PAC, PSP, PXF, and Pnoise. The PSS analysis works with both autonomous and driven circuits. PSS is usually used after transient analysis.

== Examples ==
The current through a capacitance of value C in time domain is $i(t)= C \frac{dv(t)}{dt}$, which becomes $v(t) = v(t_0) + \frac{1}{C}\int_{t_0}^{t_0 + t}{i(t)dt}$ . For this component operating in a periodic steady state circuit, its voltage will be $v(t_0 + T) = v(t_0)$ when T is equal to its fundamental period. Referring back to the original voltage function $v(t) = v(t_0) + \frac{1}{C}\int_{t_0}^{t_0 + t}{i(t)dt}$, it can be determined that the average current flowing through the capacitor is zero in periodic steady state.
