= 55th Mobile Command and Control Squadron =

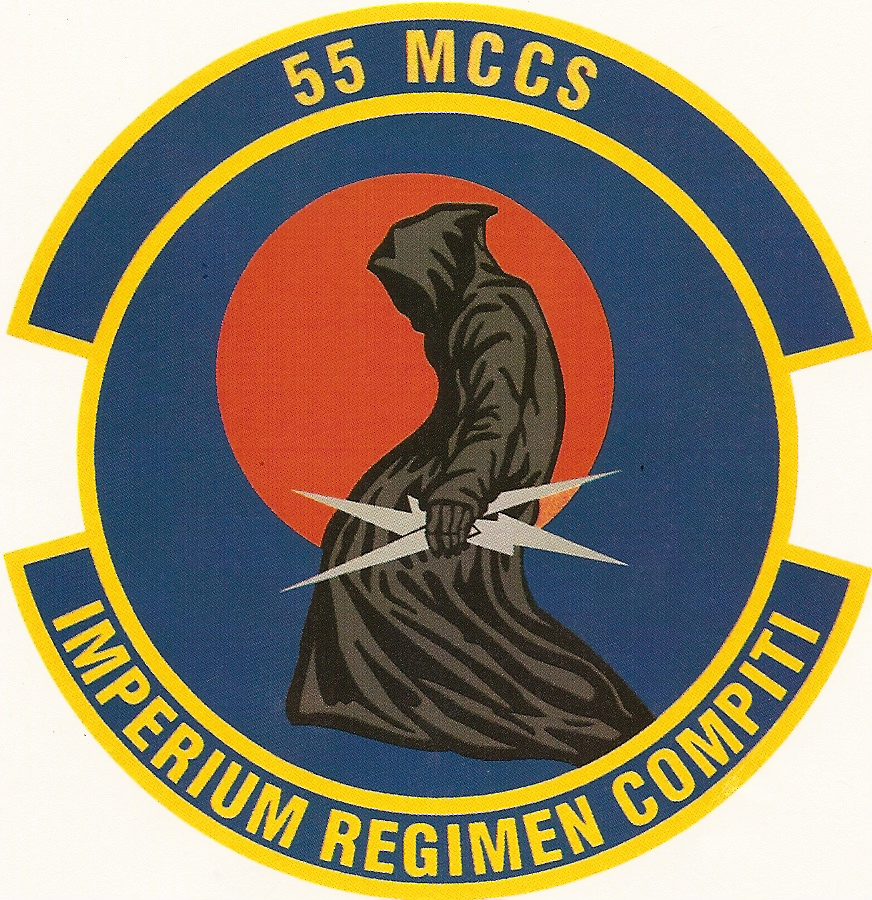
- 55th Mobile Command and Control Squadron emblem
- Active: 1978-2006
- Country: United States
- Branch: United States Air Force
- Type: Command and Control
- Role: Survivable C2
- Part of: ACC/55th Wing
- Garrison/HQ: Offutt AFB, Nebraska
- Nickname(s): Reapers
- Motto(s): Imperium Regimen Compiti; Latin: Command and Control Crossroads
- Decorations: AFOUA GWOT-S

The United States Air Force's 55th Mobile Command and Control Squadron (55 MCCS) was a mobile command and control unit located at Offutt AFB, Nebraska.

== History ==
Personnel of the 55 MCCS were trained in their primary specialty, in addition to vital expeditionary capabilities that ensure survival.

=== Logo Significance ===
Blue and yellow are the Air Force colors. Blue alludes to the sky, the primary theater of Air Force operations. Yellow refers to the sun and the excellence required of Air Force personnel.

== Previous designations ==
- 55th Mobile Command and Control Squadron (1 July 1994 – 30 September 2006)

== Bases stationed ==
- Offutt AFB, Nebraska (1 July 1994 – 30 September 2006)

== Commanders ==
- Lt Col John J. Jordan (2000–2002)
- Maj. Karen Hibbard (2005-2006)
- Lt Col Ronald J. Hefner (1997-1999)

== Equipment Utilized ==
- Mobile Consolidated Command Center (1998 – present),
- MILSTAR
- DSCS
- Single Channel Anti-Jam Man Portable (SCAMP) terminals

== Decorations ==
- Air Force Outstanding Unit Award
  - 1 July 1994 – 31 July 1995
  - 1 June 1997 – 31 May 1999
  - 1 June 1999 – 31 May 2001
  - 1 June 2002 – 31 May 2004
  - 1 June 2004 – 31 May 2006

== See also ==
- 4th Command and Control Squadron
- 153d Command and Control Squadron
- 721st Mobile Command and Control Squadron
