= British Columbia School Sports =

Sports governing body in British Columbia

BC School Sports
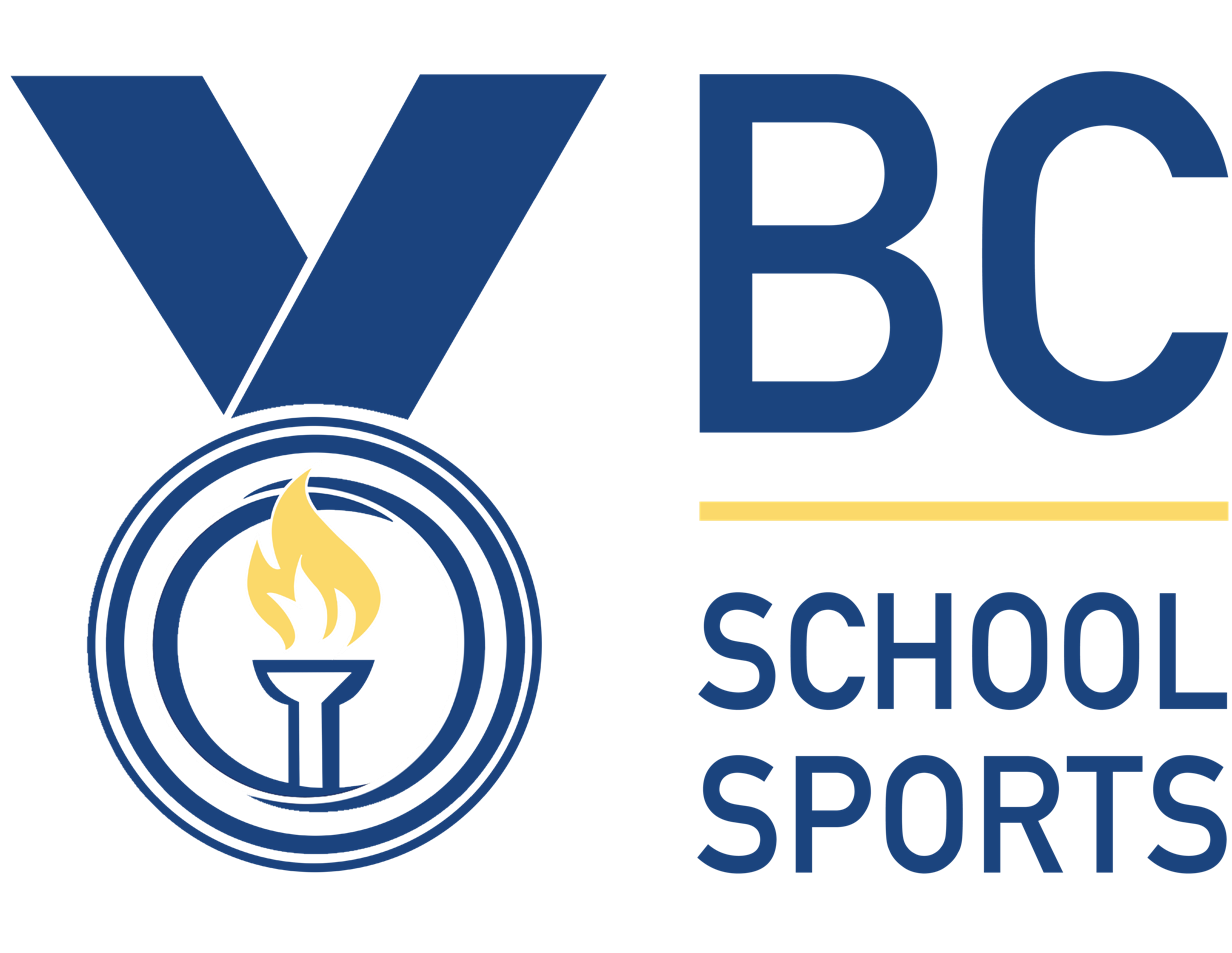
- The current logo used to represent BC School Sports since 2020
- Abbreviation: BCSS or BC School Sports
- Founder: Group of Interested Teachers and Administrators
- Coordinates: 49°15′02.4″N 122°58′00.6″W
- Region served: British Columbia
- Services: Provides competition rules for the majority of British Columbia schools.
- Official language: English
- Association President: Bo Sidhu, Christine Mcnulty, Jamie Askew, et al.
- Website: www.bcschoolsports.ca
- Formerly called: British Columbia Federation of School Athletic Associations

The logo used to represent BC School Sports before 2020

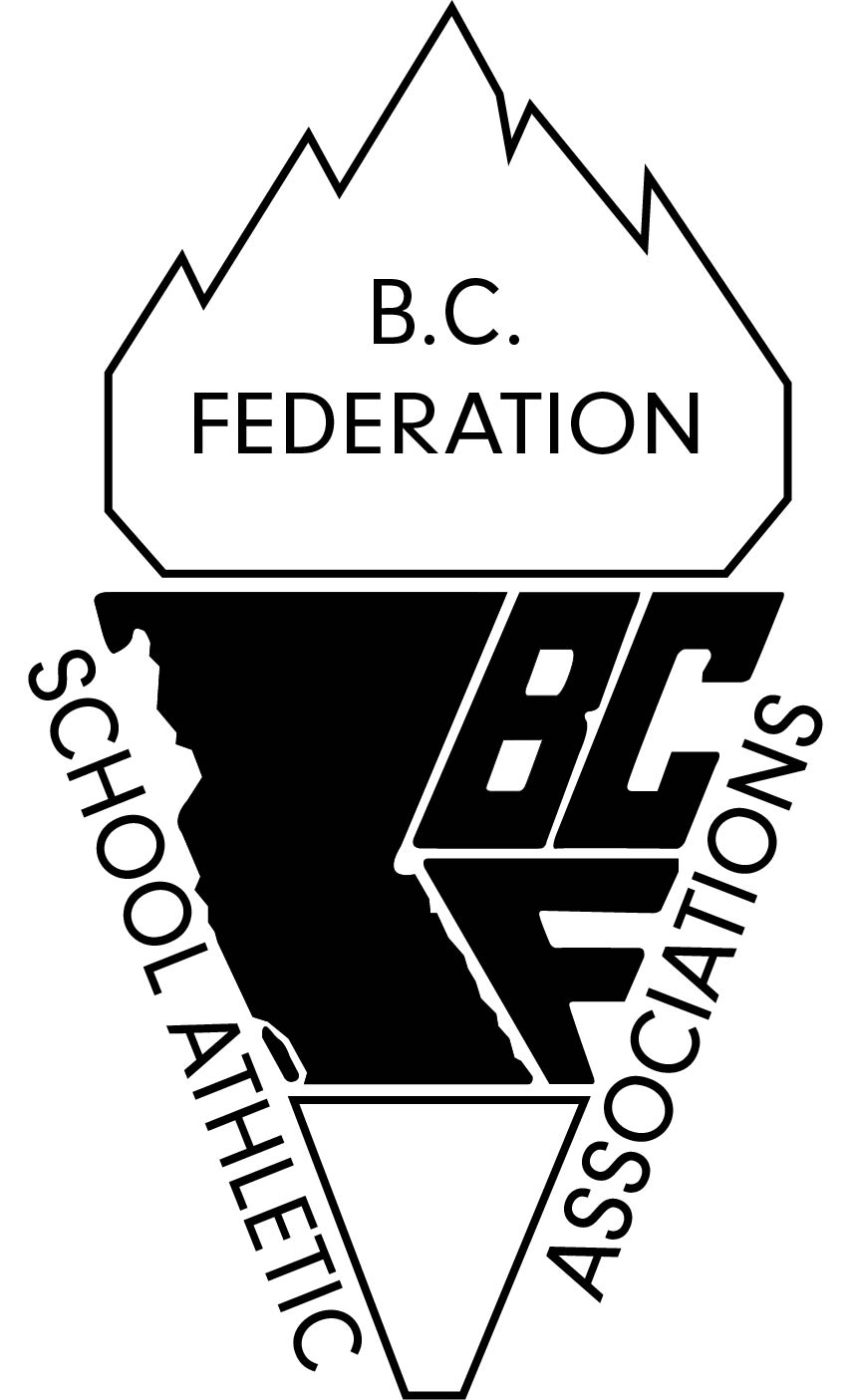
The first logo used to represent BC School Sports when the original name was BCFSAA (British Columbia Federation School Athletic Associations)

British Columbia School Sports (BCSS) is an organisation dedicated to organising sport competitions in British Columbia, Canada.

== Overview and History ==
BC School Sports was created in 1965, and was originally known as the British Columbia Federation of School Athletic Associations (BCFSAA). The group was founded by a group of teachers and administrators who were interested in creating an organisation that would assist in organising school sport functions. The first constitution of the group was adopted in 1966. The provincial government provided assistance to the group, and the organisation was able to open the doors of its first office in January 1970. The name changed from BCFSAA into British Columbia School Sports (BCSS or BC School Sports) in 1980–81.

== Governing of the Group ==
The BCSS is self-governed by an assembly of the Member Schools. While the group is self-governed, they continue to accept input from several groups, including School Districts, and the BC Ministry of Education. The combination of all Member Schools is referred to as the "Legislative Assembly". Together, they make decisions over BC School Sports' rules and regulations, policies of operation, fees, association advocacy programs, position statements, and membership programs and services.

== Leaders ==
=== Association Presidents ===
The BCSS has 22 different Association Presidents, as well as a number of different members of the Board of Directors, the list following includes contact information.

== Sports ==
The British Columbia School Sports commissions 20 different sports, including: Aquatics, Badminton, Basketball Boys, Basketball Girls, Cross Country Running, Curling, Field Hockey, American football, Golf, Mountain Biking, Rugby Football, Skiing and Snowboarding, Soccer, Tennis, Track and Field, Volleyball Boys, Volleyball Girls, and Wrestling. All sports listed have their respective Provincial Championships each year.

As announced in the 2023 AGM Meeting Notice of Motions Outcome, Gymnastics will no longer be recognized as a BC School Sports activity due to a Motion made by the Thompson-Okanagan zone.

== Recognition ==
The BCSS offers several different awards to both students and coaches, and gives scholarships to students who are exceptional athletes.

=== Awards ===
==== Merit Award ====
The first award is the Merit Award. The award is a plaque that has been engraved with the recipient's name. A maximum of six people can be awarded it every year. To meet the criteria for the award, nominees must:

- Have been a coach and/or a sponsor, administrator, or official at a school level.
- Have been an administrator in at least one of the following: Executive of a Local Association, Executive of a Sport Commission, member of the Standing Committee, or member of the BCSS Board of Directors.
- Must not currently be part of the BC School Sports Board of Directors.

==== Coach of the Year ====
The purpose of the Coach of the Year award, according to the British Columbia School Sports website, is to, "honour one male and one female colleague who have made an outstanding contribution over an extended period of time to coaching athletic programs in the secondary schools of British Columbia." The award is a shared perpetual plaque that has the name of both honorees engraved upon it. The plaque is then placed in the British Columbia School Sports office. Each coach will receive a replica along with $500 in order to help them advance their coaching abilities. To be eligible to be nominated, a coach must meet the following criteria:

- Must have been actively involved in coaching high school athletics for a minimum of ten years.
- Consistently promotes the philosophy of fair play and sportsmanship.
- Must be, or have been, a teacher or school administrator.
- Must not currently be a member of the BCSS Board of Directors.

==== Outstanding School Award ====
Each school year, BCSS picks one school in the province to be given this award. The purpose of the award, according to the organisation's website, is to, "recognize a school whose special commitment to improving the lives of its students and staff through athletics, intramurals, leadership and public service has contributed significantly to the welfare of school athletics in its local community and within the province." The award is a large plaque with an engraving consistent with native markings, and is put on display in the BCSS office. The school that is awarded is given a royal blue and gold banner to show that they have won the award. In order to be eligible for the award, the candidate school must be in good standing with the BCSS group, along with additional criteria:

- Extent of Extent of extracurricular program;
- Quality and extent of intramural program;
- Staff involvement in coaching and sport administration;
- Participation in various BCSS programs;
- Awards earned, i.e. sportsmanship, individual or team excellence;
- Public service projects;
- Work done with special populations;
- Fund raising projects;
- Athletic program's contribution to the school community;
- Special characteristics/activities unique to the school.

==== Honour Award ====
The Honour Award is a large certificate that is framed, with the recipient's name written on it. There is also a special Honour Award Pin. The recipient is further rewarded by receiving a Gold Card, which gives the honoree the ability to take themselves and a gust to any BC School Sports Provincial Championship. The person who receives this award also has their name engraved on a plaque, to be permanently displayed in the BCSS office. Only two people receive the award per year. To receive the award, nominees must meet the following criteria:

- Must have been involved as a coach/sponsor at the school level.
- Must have served administratively on at least two of the following: Executive of a Local Association, Executive of a Sport Commission or member of a Standing Committee.
- Must have served at least one full two-year term as a member of the BCSS Board of Directors.
- Must be, or have been, a teacher or administrator.
- Must not currently be a member of the BCSS Board of Directors.

=== Scholarships ===
==== BCSS Dave Gifford Memorial Scholarship ====
Each year, BC School Sports picks one exceptional male student-athlete and one exceptional female student-athlete to receive a scholarship of $700. The scholarship is in memorial of Dave Gifford, a BCSS Director from 1988 to 1990, he received the award in 1992. He died the same year. Students who receive the award must be athletically eligible, have competed in at least two BCSS sports in their grade 12 year, and have at least a 75% GPA in their 11 and 12 grade years. They must have also made a positive impact on their school and community.

==== BCSS Zone Scholarships ====
Each year, British Columbia School Sports picks two students (One boy and one girl) from each of the nine zones to receive a scholarship of $500. The recipient must be athletically eligible and compete in one or more BCSS sports during their grade 12 year. A GPA of at least 75% is required in their grade 11 and 12 year. The zones are:

- Zone A - Kootenay Secondary Secondary Schools
- Zone B - Thompson-Okanagan Secondary Schools
- Zone C - North Central Secondary Schools
- Zone D - Northwest Secondary Schools
- Zone E - Vancouver Island Secondary Schools
- Zone F - Vancouver Sea-to-Sky Secondary Schools
- Zone F - Fraser North Secondary Schools
- Zone G - South Fraser Secondary Schools
- Zone G - Eastern Valley Secondary Schools

== BCSS Zones ==
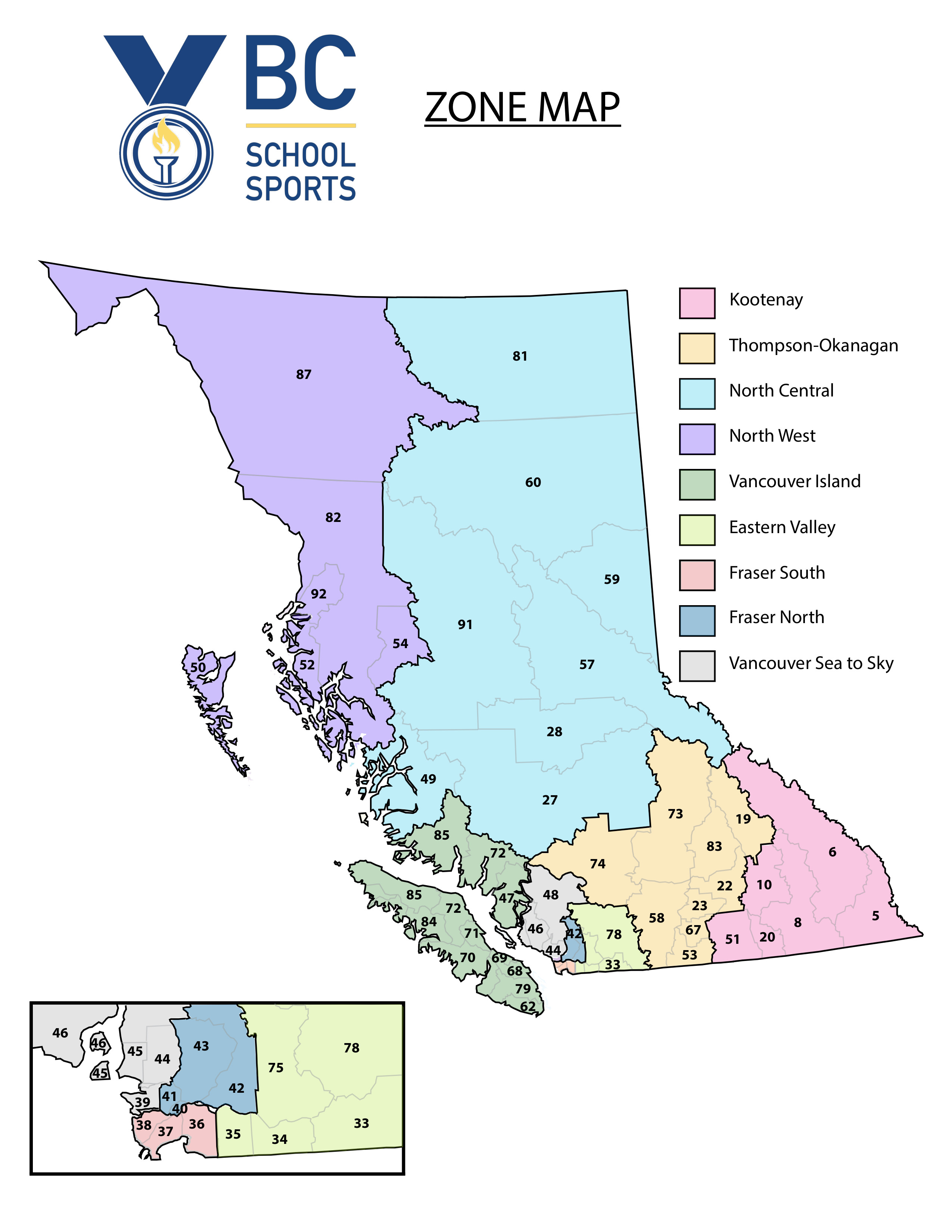
The current BC School Sports Zones Map, featuring the areas of all nine zones that make up the province of British Columbia

In order to ensure that all BC School Sports championships are at the provincial level, BCSS divides the province into nine zones each with one zone competition per sport to qualify for a provincial championship. The zones all vary in size in an attempt to balance the populations of each zone, and have been redrawn at times to reflect this. Since British Columbia's population is high in its lower half and low in its higher half, the top half of BC has two big zones to try to match the populations of the zones in the lower half of BC, where the zones are small but still have a large number of people. Despite this, the lower zones of BC (such as South Fraser, Vancouver Island, Eastern Valley, etc.) typically perform better at provincial championships than the higher zones of BC (Such as Northwest and North Central) because they have a larger population. An example of this is berthing for different sports (Not all of BCSS's sports have the same berthing system, but they are mostly similar). [For Track & Field], Northwest and North Central get to send the top one placements from each race at the Zones meet to the provincial championships, whereas Thompson-Okanagan sends the top four and South Fraser sends the top six. BCSS provincial championships are typically hosted in the lower mainland zones of BC, and sometimes Vancouver Island and Thompson-Okanagan.

The BCSS zones are similar to the BC Games zones, but have several differences like names, geographics and colours. BCSS also has one extra zone than BC Games, Fraser North, which is divided between South Fraser and Eastern Valley on the BC Games map. BCSS identifies their zones by letter, however they also group in multiple zones to one letter in the process. Ex: Zone G contains cities from South Fraser and Eastern Valley. In the BC Games, athletes qualify from their zone competition for their sport and attend the BC Games as a representative of their zone. In a BCSS Competition, athletes qualify from their zone competition for their sport and attend the BCSS provincial competition as a representative of their Middle School or High School.

Below is a list of the nine BCSS zones (top) with their respective zone letter, name and colour and then the eight BC Games zones (bottom) with their respective zone number, name and colour. (The BC Games zones are put in the same order as the BCSS zones)

BC School Sports Zones (2019\2020 School Year-Current)
Zone Letter	Zone Name	Zone Colour
Zone A	Kootenay	Hot Pink
Zone B	Thompson-Okanagan	Yellow
Zone C	North Central	Light Blue
Zone D	Northwest	Purple
Zone E	Vancouver Island	Dark Green
Zone F	Vancouver Sea-to-Sky	Grey
Zone F	Fraser North	Cyan
Zone G	Fraser South	Pink
Zone G	Eastern Valley	Light Green

BC Games Zones (2015-Current)
Zone Number	Zone Name	Zone Colour
Zone 1	Kootenays	Yellow
Zone 2	Thompson-Okanagan	Red
Zone 3	Fraser Valley	Light Blue
Zone 4	Northwest	Purple
Zone 5	Vancouver Coastal	Green
Zone 6	Vancouver Island-Central Coast	Light Green
Zone 7	North West	Purple
Zone 8	Cariboo-North East	Dark Blue

The two links below contain: PNGs\PDFs of two retro BCSS zone maps, the current BCSS zone map and the current BC Games zone map all in a Google Drive folder An information page on the BC Games Zones from the BC Games website

- Google Drive folder - https://drive.google.com/drive/folders/1dvpjqO1mNW3Yr32zOn3GqHCsZ7aNjoKz?usp=sharing
- BC Games Zone Information Page - https://bcgames.org/Games/Zones/
