= Partito Socialista =

Partito Socialista is Italian for "Socialist Party" and may refer to:

- Socialist Party (San Marino) (Partito Socialista, PS), 2012–date
- Socialist Party (Italy, 1996) (Partito Socialista, PS), 1996–2001, led by Ugo Intini and Gianni De Michelis
- Socialist Party (Italy, 2007) (Partito Socialista, PS), founded in 2007 by the merger of six minor social-democratic parties and subsequently renamed Italian Socialist Party (Italian: Partito Socialista Italiano, PSI)

The term may also refer to:

- Italian Socialist Party (Italian: Partito Socialista Italiano, PSI), 1892–1994
- Reformist Socialist Party (Italian: Partito Socialista Riformista, PSR), 1994–1996, led by Enrico Manca and Fabrizio Cicchitto
- Sammarinese Socialist Party (Italian: Partito Socialista Sammarinese, PSS), 1892–2005
- Social Democratic Party of Switzerland (Italian: Partito Socialista Svizzero), 1888–date

== See also ==
- List of socialist parties
