= Popatlal Secondary School =

- Shule ya Sekondari Popatlali (Swahili)

Location
- Hospital Road; Tanga; Tanzania
- Coordinates: 5°3′55.93″S 39°6′48.66″E

Information
- School type: Private
- Motto: Self Reliance
- Religious affiliation: Non-denominational
- Established: 1968
- Founder: Bhanji Laxman
- Status: Active
- Authority: Tanga Secondary Education Society
- School number: S0340
- Headmaster: Magayane Khatwib.
- Gender: Coeducational
- Age: 14 to 19
- Education system: Tanzanian
- Language: English
- Hours in school day: 7:00 AM - 4:10 PM
- Classrooms: 16
- Campus type: Urban
- Houses: Atlas, Kilimanjaro, Cameroon, Everest
- Colours: Grey; Pink; White
- Alumni: Popians

Popatlal Secondary School (PSS) was a co-educational, private, secondary school in the north-eastern Tanzanian city of Tanga. It was one of the oldest schools in the city.

== History ==
The school was established in 1968 and formally opened by President Julius Nyerere, the country's first president.

It was named in the memory of Mr Popatlal Bhanji Laxman, the founder's eldest son, who died in a car accident. Mr. Kulwant Babu Chaudry has been the longest-serving headmaster (1968–2004).

It runs under the auspices of the Tanga Education Society, formerly known as Tanga Secondary Education Society. The POPATLAL chain of schools falls under the sole ownership of the Registered Trustees of the Tanga Education Society herein after referred to as "The Society." These are a set of built in succession, starting with the secondary school and followed a nursery school (Kindergarten) and Primary School.

== School life ==
=== Curriculum ===
It offers both secondary (O Level) and post-secondary (A Level) education. Also available are Kindergarten and Primary Schools.

== Notable alumni ==
- Fredrick Gerson Mariki (aka Mkoloni), member of the Wagosi Wa Kaya band.
- Jacob Stephen, Tanzanian actor, director and producer
- Jitu Soni, Member of the 10th Tanzanian Parliament for Babati Rural constituency
