= Parkview Secondary School =

Discontinued secondary school

Coordinates: 43.2515°N 79.8281°W

Parkview Secondary School was located at 60 Balsam Avenue Hamilton, Ontario, and was a member of the Hamilton-Wentworth District School Board. Parkview Secondary School had a 2009–2010 enrollment of 333. The school's mission statement was "Educating students to become lifelong learners and contributing citizens in a challenging, changing, multi-cultural world". Parkview Secondary School used the Ontario Secondary School Literacy Test (OSSLT) to assess Grade 10 students' skills in reading and writing. Successful completion of the test is one of 32 requirements students need to attain in order to receive an Ontario Secondary School Diploma. The school offered special education classes and it has an ESL program. It had also run a credit granting Vocational Pathways Program that prepared student for the transition to the workplace. The school was closed at the end of June 2014, with all students relocating to Delta Secondary or Mountain Secondary, and as of late 2014, the school has been demolished to make room for parking for Hamilton's newly reconstructed football stadium.

Officials and Administrators	Name
School Principal	Paul Beattie
Vice Principal	Jeff Moore
Superintendent	John Laverty
Director of Education	John Malloy
Trustee	Tim Simmons

== Program highlights and student support programs ==
Parkview Secondary School takes part in the following programs:

- Food and Catering Program
- Cosmetology Program
- Remedial English and Math Programs
- Technical Programs (Auto, Wood, Home repair)
- Conservatory NNECT Project
- Panther of the month
- Student Success room & staff
- Learning Resource room & staff
- Peer tutoring
- Health Initiatives for Youth (HIFY)
- Alternatives for Youth (AY)

== Clubs ==
Parkview Secondary School offered the following clubs:

- Science Club
- Checkers and Chess
- Anime Club
- Ball Hockey
- Yoga
- Breakfast Club
- Free lunch program
- Walk-In Closet
- Football
- Hockey
- Annual Christmas Store
- Drive to Success Program
- OSSLT

== Environmental focus ==
Parkview Secondary School was active in the following Parkview environmental initiatives:

- Improvement of Physical Plant
- Actively review, update and implement the Safe school plan
- Improve attendance and punctuality

== See also ==
- List of high schools in Ontario
