= PlayStation Magazine =

PlayStation Magazine may refer to:

== Official ==
- Official U.S. PlayStation Magazine
- PlayStation: The Official Magazine (US), which was called PlayStation Magazine until late 2007
- PlayStation Official Magazine – UK
- PlayStation Official Magazine – Australia
- Official PlayStation Magazine (Ireland)

== Unofficial ==
- PlayStation Magazine (Italy)
