= 153d Command and Control Squadron =

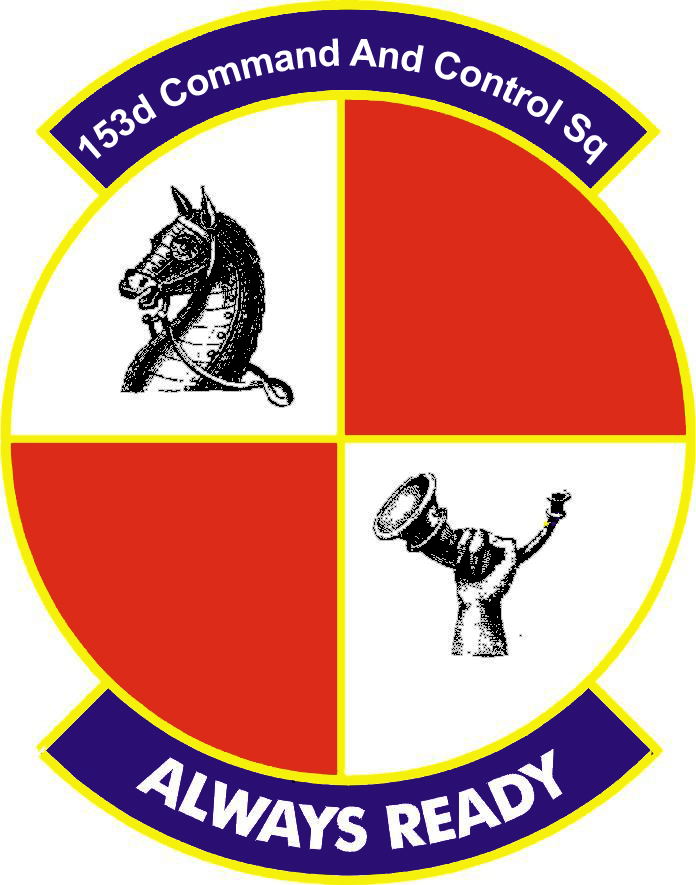
- 153d Command and Control Squadron emblem (Note: The armored warhorse in the upper left quadrant of the shield is the symbol of that elite mobile warrior, the knight. The trumpet, or horn, in the lower right quadrant of the shield represents the instrument of command and control used by ancient armies. Kings and great nobles used the trumpet to call their martial forces to war as well as to control their movements on the battlefield. Thus, the symbols of the mobile warrior and the military horn are significant for the squadron. The color white on the unit shield traditionally denotes honor while the color red implies valor and even the blood of life or spirit of self-sacrifice. Both the color red and the horn tie the squadron to an early medieval legend, that of "Roland and the Horn" at the Battle of Roncevalles in 778. Charlemagne, king of the Franks, began to return home to France across the Pyrenees Mountains while Sir Roland guarded the rear of his army some distance behind. If ambushed by the enemy, Roland had been instructed to blow the trumpet and Charlemagne would charge to his assistance. Roland was indeed attacked, and in overwhelming numbers. Roland faced a terrible decision: if he called in Charlemagne's forces, all of the army faced destruction, or if he did not sound the trumpet [harlemagne and the main army would continue to safety while he and his tiny command would surely die. Gallantly, Roland and his men put the war horn away and prepared to make their last stand. The next day Charlemagne learned of the valiant deed and named Sir Roland the greatest of his knights.)
- Active: 2002 – present
- Country: United States
- Branch: United States Air Force
- Type: Command and Control
- Role: Mobile Command and Control
- Part of: Wyoming Air National Guard
- Garrison/HQ: F. E. Warren AFB, Wyoming
- Mottos: Always Ready; Sound the H0rn
- Colors: Red, Blue and Gold
- Mascot: Armored Horse
- Decorations: Air Force Outstanding Unit Award

Commanders
- Current commander: Lt Col Eric R. Hill

The United States Air Force's 153d Command and Control Squadron (153 CACS) is a command and control unit located at F. E. Warren Air Force Base, Wyoming.

== Mission ==
The 153d Command and Control Squadron (153 CACS) mobilizes communications, automated data processing, and combat logistics for United States Northern Command commanders.

== History ==
=== 4th Command and Control Squadron ===
Air Force Space Command inactivated the 4th Command and Control Squadron and transferred its mission to the Wyoming Air National Guard on 2 July 2002, with the activation of the 153 CACS and the inactivation of 4th.

=== 721st Mobile Command and Control Squadron ===
The 721st Mobile Command and Control Squadron (originally the 1003rd Mobile Command and Control Squadron) was reassigned from the 721st Support Group (Cheyenne Mountain Air Force Station), to the 90th Operations Group, 90th Space Wing on 1 July 1999. The 153 CACS inherited equipment and mission from the 721 MCCS when the latter unit was inactivated in 1998.

== Bases stationed ==
- F. E. Warren Air Force Base, Wyoming (1998 – present)

== Equipment Operated ==
AN/TSQ-194 (1998 – present)

== Decorations ==
- Air Force Outstanding Unit Award
  - 1 October 1995 – 30 September 1997 (as the 721 MCCS)
