= Richard Lacey (microbiologist) =

British microbiologist and writer (1940–2019)

Richard Westgarth Lacey
- Born: 11 October 1940; Essex
- Died: 3 February 2019 (aged 78); Rawdon, West Yorkshire
- Occupations: British microbiologist, writer

Richard Westgarth Lacey (11 October 1940 – 3 February 2019) was a British microbiologist and writer, known for arguing that Bovine spongiform encephalopathy "mad cow disease" can be passed to humans.

== Biography ==
Lacey read medicine at the University of Cambridge. Subsequently he became a lecturer, later reader at the University of Bristol, where he gained his PhD. He was appointed to the chair of clinical microbiology at the University of Leeds in 1983, where he remained until his retirement in 1998 to become an emeritus professor.

In 1990 Lacey was ridiculed for suggesting a link between bovine spongiform encephalopathy (BSE) and its human Variant Creutzfeldt–Jakob disease. He was vindicated in 1996. Lacey warned of the dangers of BSE before the crisis was revealed by the government. Lacey believed there was a "systematic cover-up" from the government and scientists about the dangers of food that British people eat. He made headlines after a Sunday Times interview in which he called for the slaughter of all BSE-infected herds. Lacey gave up eating beef in 1988 but was not a vegetarian. He stated he was not a conspiracy theorist until the crisis of BSE.

Lacey was acclaimed for standing by his beliefs but had been denounced by the media as a panic monger and self-publicist.

== Selected publications ==
- Safe Shopping, Safe Cooking, Safe Eating (1989)
- Unfit for Human Consumption (1991)
- Hard to Swallow: A Brief History of Food (1994)
- Mad Cow Disease: History of BSE in Britain (1994)
- Poison on a Plate: The Dangers in the Food We Eat and How to Avoid Them (1998)
- Germ Wars (2019)

== See also ==
- Harash Narang
- United Kingdom BSE outbreak
- Variant Creutzfeldt–Jakob disease
