= Harash Narang =

British Indian microbiologist and virologist (1942–2008)

Harash Komar Narang
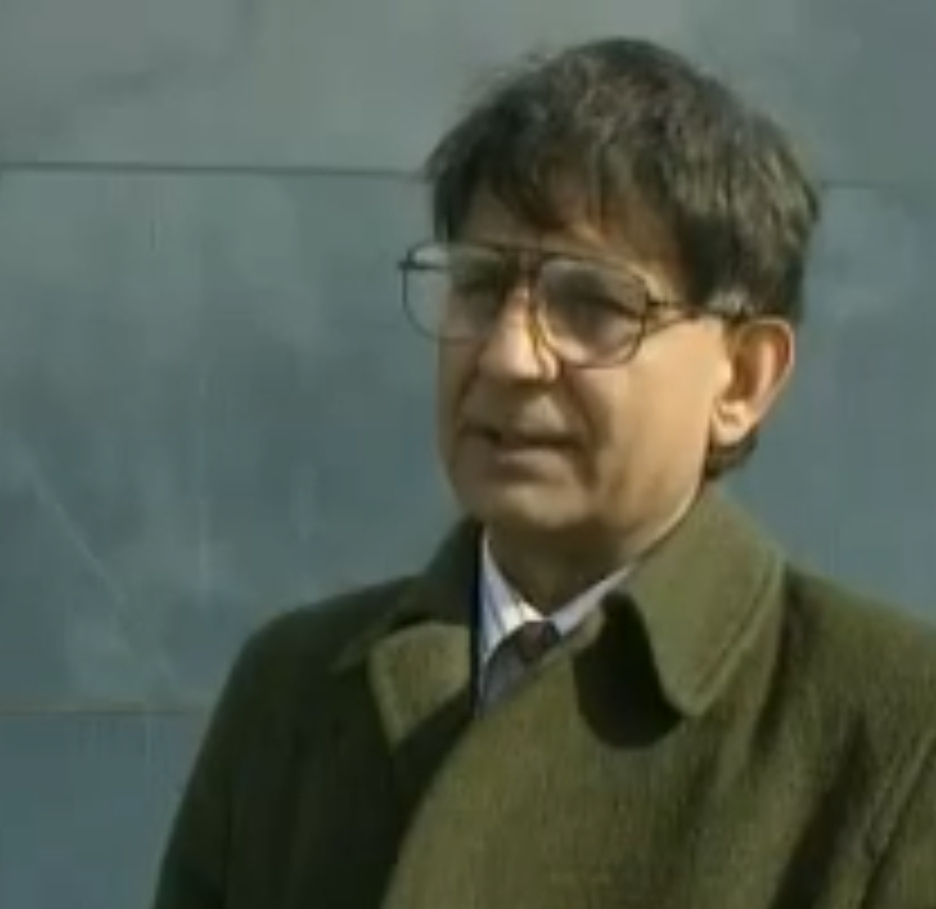
- Narang in May 2002
- Born: Harash Komar Narang; 13 January 1942; Punjab, India
- Died: 31 May 2008 (aged 66); Hexham, Northumberland
- Alma mater: University of Newcastle
- Known for: Research linking vCJD and BSE
- Spouse: Sushila Narang
- Children: 1
- Scientific career
- Fields: Microbiology; Virology

Signature
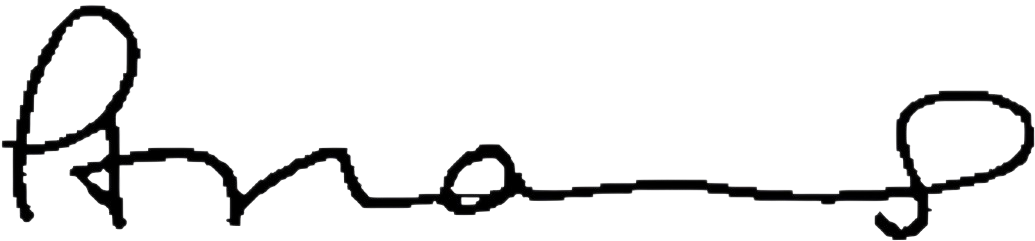

Harash Komar Narang (13 January 1942 – 31 May 2008) was a British Indian microbiologist and clinical virologist known for his outspoken views linking Creutzfeldt–Jakob disease (CJD) and Bovine spongiform encephalopathy (BSE).

== Career and research ==
=== Early career ===
Narang trained as a zoologist studying plant parasitology in the late 1960s. After graduation, he worked from 1970 until 1977 for the Medical Research Council at Newcastle General Hospital, where he became interested in transmissible spongiform encephalopathies (TSEs). Narang recalled raising concerns over cattle being fed meat and bone meal, during an inspection of an abattoir in the 1970s. He noted the risks of scrapie, a neurodegenerative disease found in sheep, to enter the food chain.

=== Public Health Laboratory Service ===
Narang then joined the Public Health Laboratory Service as a microbiologist in 1977. He was granted leave in 1985, and studied in the laboratory of Daniel Carleton Gajdusek, who had won a Nobel Prize for his research into kuru, at the National Institutes of Health in Bethesda, Maryland.

As the United Kingdom BSE outbreak unfolded in the late 1980s, he developed diagnostic tests for Bovine spongiform encephalopathy (BSE). He described the infectious agent as a 'nemavirus' - a single-stranded DNA fibril with a protein coat - rather than the major prion protein theory that was ultimately accepted as scientific consensus. He adopted a 'touch impression technique', using electron microscopy to analyse brain surface impressions, for detecting BSE in abattoir meat. He later set up a non-invasive urine test which examined concentrated samples of urine with an electron microscope to identify specific structures and fibres.

He also claimed that infection rates amongst cattle were much higher than being recorded. In 1989, his application for funding to help develop the technique was turned down by the Ministry of Agriculture.

In 1990 Narang argued that there was evidence that BSE could cross the species barrier and infect humans. After publishing a letter in The Lancet about his diagnostic test for both BSE and CJD, his work on TSEs attracted the support of local businessman Ken Bell, who donated £20,000, and David Clark MP, the Shadow Minister of Agriculture who raised the issue in a parliamentary debate.

=== Disciplinary Hearings ===
Narang faced a disciplinary inquiry into his work, which needed to be peer reviewed by other scientists. A second disciplinary action was set up after he impersonated a ward doctor when conducting surveillance on northern hospitals for human BSE cases in the summer of 1992.

From 1993, his work was under trial in London by three scientists, overseen by Professor Jeffrey Almond, who served as a virologist at the University of Reading and was a member of the Spongiform Encephalopathy Advisory Committee (SEAC). The trial found no single strands of DNA. Narang later claimed the PHLS had forced him to go there and described the findings as "a waste of time and effort".

In August 1994, he was dismissed from the PHLS. An employment tribunal later ruled this had been due to cuts to Department of Health funding. He then worked as an independent virologist under Ken Bell International in Newcastle.

=== Independent research ===
Stephen Churchill, a 19-year-old from Devizes was the first recorded death from Variant Creutzfeldt–Jakob disease (vCJD) in June 1995. Narang visited Churchill's family in the wake of his death.

Following the death of Jean Wake in September 1995, it was reported that Narang's test proved that she had died of CJD. In February 1996, he again asserted a link between BSE and human Creutzfeldt–Jakob disease after the death of 21-year-old Peter Hall. Narang had been invited by Hall's parents to conduct the urine test, which indicated a positive result for the 'BSE virus', and they subsequently called for the government to conduct more tests. Narang also joined the Northern CJD Group, a local pressure group.

In July 1996, Narang, along with the mother of Stephen Churchill and the parents of Peter Hall, delivered a petition with 10,000 signatures to the House of Commons, which called for more CJD tests. Critics described Narang, along with another scientist arguing that BSE could infect humans, Richard Lacey, as conspiracy theorists and accused them of fearmongering for personal gain. Narang argued that the government had covered up the full extent of the BSE scandal to protect the UK's beef industry.

By June 1997, he was investigating the possibility that BSE could spread to chickens, after reporting neurodegenerative symptoms in livestock at farms he had visited. In September 1997, he issued a writ, with support from relatives of CJD victims, at the High Court in London alleging that his former employer, the PLHS, had made him redundant because of his belief in a link between BSE and CJD. In 1998, he repeated his claims at the BSE public enquiry. In August 1999, the Medical Research Council abandoned efforts to develop a reliable test, based on Narang's work, to detect BSE in cattle.

In October 2000, he reasserted his belief that the infectious agent in BSE was a virus. In 2005, Narang dismissed a theory from Professor Alan Colchester, that BSE had originated from human remains in India and Pakistan.

== Political candidacy ==
At the 2001 United Kingdom general election, Narang announced he would be standing as an independent candidate in Newcastle upon Tyne East and Wallsend. Narang likened himself to Martin Bell, and campaigned to scrap university university tuition fees. On 4 June, he headed a convoy of tractors through the constituency. He placed fifth with 563 votes (1.7%).

== Personal life and death ==
Narang suffered a cardiac arrest and died on 31 May 2008, aged 66.

== Publications ==
- Death on the Menu: Families Devastated by 'Mad Cow' Disease Reveal Their Tragic Stories (1997)
- The Link: Creutzfeldt-Jakob Disease / Bovine Spongiform Encephalopathy - The Manufactured Disease (1997)
- A Critical Review of Atypical Cerebellum-Type Creutzfeldt-Jakob Disease: Its Relationship to "New Variant" CJD and Bovine Spongiform Encephalopathy (July 2001)
- A Critical Review of the Nature of the Spongiform Encephalopathy Agent: Protein Theory Versus Virus Theory (February 2002)
- Sensitive Detection of Prion Protein in Human Urine (June 2005)

== See also ==
- Mad cow crisis
- Variant Creutzfeldt–Jakob disease
