= Creekstone Farms Premium Beef =

Beef processing company in Kansas, United States

Creekstone Farms Premium Beef LLC
- Type: private
- Industry: Meat packing
- Founded: 1995
- Founder: John and Carol Stewart
- Headquarters: Arkansas City, Kansas, United States
- Number of locations: 1
- Area served: United States
- Key people: Keizo Kada (CEO)
- Owner: Marubeni Corporation
- Website: www.creekstonefarms.com

Creekstone Farms Premium Beef, LLC is an American beef processing company in Arkansas City, Kansas.

== History ==
The company was founded in 1995 by John and Carol Stewart. Originally a purebred Black Angus farm in Campbellsburg, Kentucky, Creekstone Farms entered the processing business in 2003 purchasing a 450,000-square-foot (42,000 m^{2}) processing plant in Arkansas City, Kansas. The company began processing Creekstone Farms Premium Black Angus cattle in May 2003. In the spring of 2004, it launched an additional line of Black Angus products, Creekstone Farms Natural Black Angus Beef. Stewart retired from the company in October 2007.

Creekstone Farms provides halal beef.

Creekstone Farms is currently owned by the Marubeni Corporation and was owned by Sun Capital Partners. When Stewart retired, he retained ownership of the farm in Kentucky, which has since been sold and is no longer connected to the Creekstone Farms brand.

In 2026, the company reported that Japan's ban on U.S. beef, which began in 2003, had caused it to lose a third of its sales, prompting the layoff of about 150 people.

== BSE testing ==
Creekstone Farms is known for its attempt to test all of its beef for bovine spongiform encephalopathy (BSE), also known as "mad cow disease". At a cost of about half a million dollars, Creekstone built a testing lab, the first inside a U. S. meat packing plant, and hired the necessary personnel. In 2004, however, the U.S. Department of Agriculture, which controls the sale of testing kits, refused to sell Creekstone enough to test all of its cows.

The USDA stated that allowing any meatpacking company to test every cow would undermine the agency's official position that random testing was scientifically adequate to assure safety. The USDA also claims that testing does not ensure food safety because the disease is difficult to detect in younger animals. An alternative position is that the USDA's objection is due to the pressure from larger meatpacking operations. The National Cattlemen's Beef Association president told The Washington Post, "If testing is allowed at Creekstone, we think it would become the international and domestic standard, too." Creekstone Farms says tests cost about $20 per animal, increasing the cost of beef by about 10 cents per pound. The USDA currently tests about 1 percent of cattle slaughtered in the U.S.

=== Lawsuit ===
In March 2006, Creekstone filed a lawsuit against the USDA for refusing to allow complete testing. On March 29, 2007, Judge James Robertson of the U.S. District Court for the District of Columbia ruled that the USDA had the authority to restrict the use of biological products and to regulate diagnostic testing but that this authority did not extend to the regulation of BSE test kits. On August 29, 2008, the Court of Appeals for the District of Columbia Circuit affirmed the district court's finding of the USDA's authority to restrict the use of biological products and to regulate diagnostic testing reversing the lower court's ruling that the USDA did not have the authority to regulate BSE test kits.
