= Bovine spongiform encephalopathy =

Fatal neurodegenerative disease of cattle

- Other names: Mad cow disease
- A cow with BSE, showing abnormal posture and emaciation
- Specialty: Neurology, veterinary medicine
- Symptoms: Abnormal behavior, trouble walking, weight loss, inability to move
- Complications: Variant Creutzfeldt–Jakob disease (if BSE-infected beef is eaten by humans)
- Usual onset: 4–5 years after exposure
- Types: Classic, atypical
- Causes: A type of prion
- Risk factors: Feeding contaminated meat and bone meal to cattle
- Diagnostic method: Suspected based on symptoms, confirmed by examination of the brain
- Prevention: Not allowing sick or older animals to enter the food supply, disallowing certain products in animal food
- Treatment: None
- Prognosis: Death within weeks to months
- Frequency: 4 reported cases (2017) As of 2024, a total of 233 cases of vCJD had been reported globally.

Bovine spongiform encephalopathy (BSE), commonly known as mad cow disease, is an incurable and always fatal neurodegenerative disease of cattle. Symptoms include abnormal behavior, trouble walking, and weight loss. Later in the course of the disease, the cow becomes unable to function normally. There is conflicting information about the time between infection and onset of symptoms. In 2002, the World Health Organization suggested it to be approximately four to five years. Time from onset of symptoms to death is generally weeks to months. Spread to humans is believed to result in variant Creutzfeldt–Jakob disease (vCJD). As of 2024, a total of 233 cases of vCJD had been reported globally.

BSE is thought to occur due to an infection by a misfolded protein, known as a prion. Cattle are believed to have been infected by being fed meat-and-bone meal that contained either the remains of cattle who spontaneously developed the disease or scrapie-infected sheep products. The United Kingdom was afflicted with an outbreak of BSE and vCJD in the 1980s and 1990s. The outbreak increased throughout the UK due to the practice of feeding meat-and-bone meal to young calves of dairy cows. Cases are suspected based on symptoms and confirmed by examination of the brain, which typically has reduced mass because of the degeneration caused by prion, which causes the brain to become spongy with holes. Cases are classified as classic or atypical, with the latter divided into H- and L types. It is a type of transmissible spongiform encephalopathy.

Efforts to prevent the disease in the UK include not allowing any animal older than 30 months to enter either the human food or animal feed supply. In continental Europe, cattle over 30 months must be tested if they are intended for human food. In North America, tissue of concern, known as specified risk material, may not be added to animal feed or pet food. About four million cows were killed during the eradication programme in the UK.

Four cases were reported globally in 2017, and the condition is considered to be nearly eradicated. In the United Kingdom, more than 184,000 cattle were diagnosed from 1986 to 2015, with the peak of new cases occurring in 1993. A few thousand additional cases have been reported in other regions of the world. In addition, it is believed that several million cattle with the condition likely entered the food supply during the outbreak.

== Signs ==
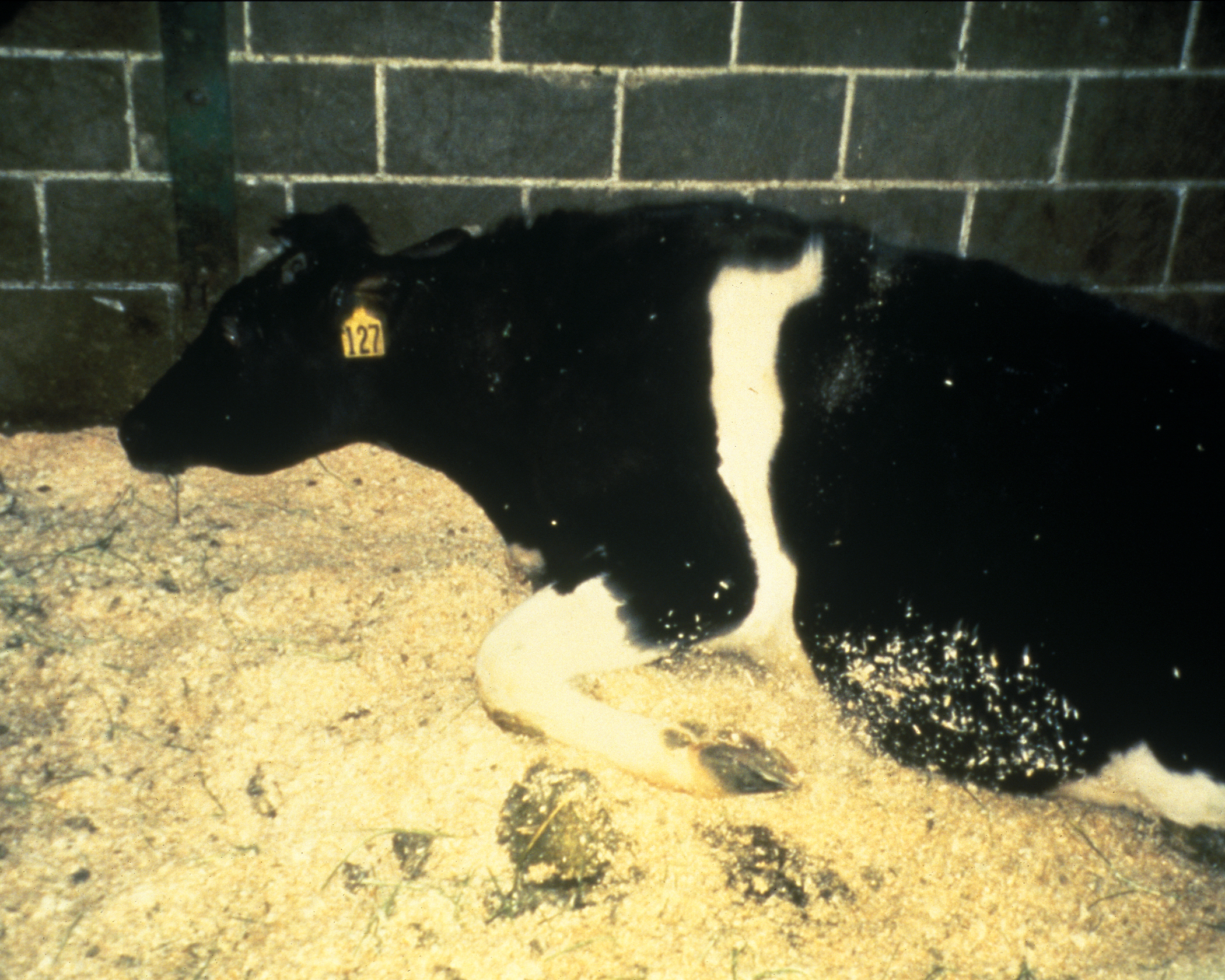
A maternal cow infected with BSE, unable to stand up as a consequence

Signs are not seen immediately in cattle, due to the disease's extremely long incubation period. Some cattle have been observed to have an abnormal gait, changes in behavior, tremors and hyper-responsiveness to certain stimuli. Hindlimb ataxia affects the animal's gait and occurs when muscle control is lost. This results in poor balance and coordination. Behavioural changes may include aggression, anxiety relating to certain situations, nervousness, frenzy and an overall change in temperament. Some rare but previously observed signs also include persistent pacing, rubbing and licking. Additionally, nonspecific signs have also been observed which include weight loss, decreased milk production, lameness, ear infections and teeth grinding due to pain. Some animals may show a combination of these signs, while others may only be observed demonstrating one of the many reported. Once clinical signs arise, they typically get worse over the subsequent weeks and months, eventually leading to recumbency (making the animal a downer), coma and death.

== Cause ==
BSE is an infectious disease believed to be due to a misfolded protein, known as a prion. Cattle are believed to have been infected from being fed meat and bone meal that contained the remains of other cattle who spontaneously developed the disease or scrapie-infected sheep products. The outbreak increased throughout the United Kingdom due to the practice of feeding meat-and-bone meal to young calves of dairy cows.

BSE prions are misfolded forms of the particular brain protein called prion protein. When this protein is misfolded, the normal alpha-helical structure is converted into a beta sheet. The prion induces normally-folded proteins to take on the misfolded phenotype in an exponential cascade. These sheets form small chains which aggregate and cause cell death. Massive cell death forms lesions in the brain which lead to degeneration of physical and mental abilities and ultimately death. The prion is not destroyed even if the beef or material containing it is cooked or heat-treated under normal conditions and pressures. Transmission can occur when healthy animals come in contact with tainted tissues from others with the disease, generally when their food source contains tainted meat.

The British Government enquiry took the view that the cause was not scrapie, as had originally been postulated, but was some event in the 1970s that could not be identified.

=== Spread to humans ===
Spread to humans is believed to result in variant Creutzfeldt–Jakob disease (vCJD). The agent can be transmitted to humans by eating food contaminated with it. Though any tissue may be involved, the highest risk to humans is believed to be from eating food contaminated with the brain, spinal cord, or digestive tract. Despite the lack of knowledge on potential factors triggering the misfolded protein forms, idiopathic prion disorders are the most prevalent, accounting for 85–90% of human cases.

== Pathogenesis ==
The pathogenesis of BSE is not well understood or documented like other diseases of this nature. Even though BSE is a disease that results in neurological defects, its pathogenesis occurs in areas that reside outside of the nervous system. There was a strong deposition of PrP^{Sc} initially located in the ileal Peyer's patches of the small intestine. The lymphatic system has been identified in the pathogenesis of scrapie. It has not, however, been determined to be an essential part of the pathogenesis of BSE. The Ileal Peyer's patches have been the only organ from this system that has been found to play a major role in the pathogenesis. Infectivity of the Ileal Peyer's patches has been observed as early as four months after inoculation. PrP^{Sc} accumulation was found to occur mostly in tangible body macrophages of the Ileal Peyer's patches. Tangible body macrophages involved in PrP^{Sc} clearance are thought to play a role in PrP^{Sc} accumulation in the Peyer's patches. Accumulation of PrP^{Sc} was also found in follicular dendritic cells, to a lesser degree. Six months after inoculation, there was no infectivity in any tissues, only that of the ileum. This led researchers to believe that the disease agent replicates here. In naturally confirmed cases, there have been no reports of infectivity in the Ileal Peyer's patches. Generally, in clinical experiments, high doses of the disease are administered. In natural cases, it was hypothesized that low doses of the agent were present, and therefore, infectivity could not be observed.

== Diagnosis ==
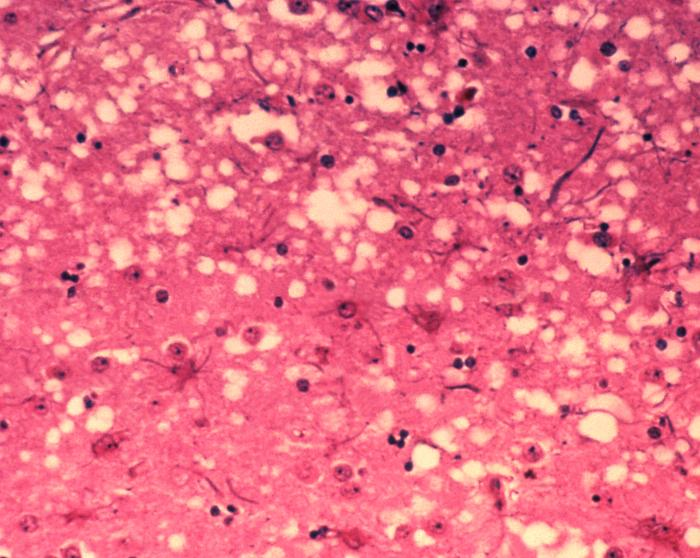
Brain tissue of a cow with BSE showing the typical microscopic "holes" in the grey matter

Diagnosis of BSE continues to be a practical problem. It has an incubation period of months to years, during which no signs are noticed, though the pathway of converting the normal brain prion protein (PrP) into the toxic, disease-related PrP^{Sc} form has started. At present, no way is known to detect PrP^{Sc} reliably except by examining post mortem brain tissue using neuropathological and immunohistochemical methods. Accumulation of the abnormally folded PrP^{Sc} form of PrP is a characteristic of the disease, but it is present at very low levels in easily accessible body fluids such as blood or urine. Researchers have tried to develop methods to measure PrP^{Sc}, but no methods for use in materials such as blood have been accepted fully.

The traditional method of diagnosis relies on histopathological examination of the medulla oblongata of the brain, and other tissues, post mortem. Immunohistochemistry can be used to demonstrate prion protein accumulation.

In 1989, a controversial diagnostic test for BSE was developed by British microbiologist Harash Narang. He described the infectious agent as a 'nemavirus' - a single-stranded DNA fibrils with a protein coat - rather than the major prion protein theory that was ultimately accepted as scientific consensus. He adopted a 'touch impression technique', using electron microscopy to analyse brain surface impressions, for detecting BSE in abattoir meat.

In 2010, a team from New York described detection of PrP^{Sc} even when initially present at only one part in a hundred billion (10^{−11}) in brain tissue. The method combines amplification with a novel technology called surround optical fiber immunoassay and some specific antibodies against PrP^{Sc}. After amplifying and then concentrating any PrP^{Sc}, the samples are labelled with a fluorescent dye using an antibody for specificity and then finally loaded into a microcapillary tube. This tube is placed in a specially constructed apparatus so it is totally surrounded by optical fibres to capture all light emitted once the dye is excited using a laser. The technique allowed detection of PrP^{Sc} after many fewer cycles of conversion than others have achieved, substantially reducing the possibility of artifacts, as well as speeding up the assay. The researchers also tested their method on blood samples from apparently healthy sheep that went on to develop scrapie. The animals' brains were analysed once any signs became apparent. The researchers could, therefore, compare results from brain tissue and blood taken once the animals exhibited signs of the diseases, with blood obtained earlier in the animals' lives, and from uninfected animals. The results showed very clearly that PrP^{Sc} could be detected in the blood of animals long before the signs appeared. After further development and testing, this method could be of great value in surveillance as a blood- or urine-based screening test for BSE.

=== Classification ===
BSE is a transmissible disease that primarily affects the central nervous system; it is a form of transmissible spongiform encephalopathy, like Creutzfeldt–Jakob disease and kuru in humans, scrapie in sheep, and chronic wasting disease in deer.

== Prevention ==
A ban on feeding meat and bone meal to cattle has resulted in a strong reduction in cases in countries where the disease has been present. In disease-free countries, control relies on import control, feeding regulations, and surveillance measures.

In UK and US slaughterhouses, the brain, spinal cord, trigeminal ganglia, intestines, eyes, and tonsils from cattle are classified as specified risk materials, and must be disposed of appropriately.

An enhanced BSE-related feed ban was enacted in both the United States (2009) and Canada (2007) to help improve prevention and elimination of BSE.

== Epidemiology ==
The tests used for detecting BSE vary considerably, as do the regulations in various jurisdictions for when, and which cattle, must be tested. For instance in the EU, the cattle tested are older (30 months or older), while many cattle are slaughtered younger than that. At the opposite end of the scale, Japan tests all cattle at the time of slaughter. Tests are also difficult, as the altered prion protein has very low levels in blood or urine, and no other signal has been found. Newer tests are faster, more sensitive, and cheaper, so future figures possibly may be more comprehensive. Even so, currently the only reliable test is examination of tissues during a necropsy.

As for vCJD in humans, autopsy tests are not always done, so those figures, too, are likely to be too low, but probably by a lesser fraction. In the United Kingdom, anyone with possible vCJD symptoms must be reported to the Creutzfeldt–Jakob Disease Surveillance Unit. In the United States, the CDC has refused to impose a national requirement that physicians and hospitals report cases of the disease. Instead, the agency relies on other methods, including death certificates and urging physicians to send suspicious cases to the National Prion Disease Pathology Surveillance Center at Case Western Reserve University in Cleveland, which is funded by the CDC.

To control potential transmission of vCJD within the United States, the FDA had established strict restrictions on individuals' eligibility to donate blood. Individuals who had spent a cumulative time of three months or more in the United Kingdom between 1980 and 1996, or a cumulative time of five years or more from 1980 to 2020 in any combination of countries in Europe, were prohibited from donating blood. Due to blood shortages associated with the 2020 COVID-19 outbreak these restrictions were temporarily rescinded in 2020. This recommendation was removed in 2022.

Similar rules also apply in Germany and formerly Australia. Anyone who lived in the UK between 1980 and 1996 for longer than six months is prohibited from giving blood. There are also prohibitions on donating breast milk and tissue. However, there are no restrictions on organ donation. Blood donation organisations first considered relaxing the rules after the COVID-19 pandemic and some natural disasters that depleted the blood supply.

=== North America ===
The first reported case in North America was in December 1993 from Alberta, Canada. Another Canadian case was reported in May 2003. The first known US occurrence came in December of the same year, it was later confirmed to be a cow of Canadian origin imported to the US. The cow was slaughtered on a farm near Yakima, Washington. The cow was included in the United States Department of Agriculture's surveillance program, specifically targeting cattle with BSE. Canada announced two additional cases of BSE from Alberta in early 2005. In June 2005, John R. Clifford, chief veterinary officer for the United States Department of Agriculture Animal and Plant Health Inspection Service, confirmed a fully domestic case of BSE in Texas.

==== United States ====
The use of animal by-product feeds was never common, as it was in Europe. Soybean meal is cheap and plentiful in the United States, and cottonseed meal (1.5 million tons of which are produced in the US every year, none of which is suitable for humans or any other simple-stomach animals) is even cheaper than soybean meal. Historically, meat and bone meal, blood meal, and meat scraps have almost always commanded a higher price as a feed additive than oilseed meals in the US, so little incentive existed to use animal products to feed ruminants. However, US regulations only partially prohibited the use of animal by-products in feed. In 1997, regulations prohibited the feeding of mammalian by-products to ruminants such as cattle and goats. However, the by-products of ruminants can still be legally fed to pets or other livestock, including pigs and poultry. In addition, it is legal for ruminants to be fed by-products from some of these animals. Because of this, some authors have suggested that under certain conditions, it is still possible for BSE incidence to increase in US cattle.

The US Department of Agriculture (USDA) announced on 19 May 2023 an atypical case of the disease in an older beef cow at a slaughter plant in South Carolina. The USDA said the animal never entered slaughter channels and the agency did not expect any trade impacts as a result. It was the seventh detection of BSE in the United States since 2003, all but one of which have been atypical.

US meat producer Creekstone Farms alleged in a lawsuit that the USDA was preventing the company from testing its slaughtered cattle for BSE.

The USDA has issued recalls of beef supplies that involved introduction of downer cows into the food supply. Hallmark/Westland Meat Packing Company was found to have used electric shocks to prod downer cows into the slaughtering system in 2007. Possibly due to pressure from large agribusiness, the United States has drastically cut back on the number of cows inspected for BSE.

==== Effect on the US beef industry ====
Japan was the top importer of US beef, buying $1.7 billion worth in 2003. After the discovery of the first case of BSE in the US on 23 December 2003, Japan halted US beef imports. In December 2005, Japan once again allowed imports of US beef, but reinstated its ban in January 2006 after a violation of the US-Japan beef import agreement: a vertebral column, which should have been removed prior to shipment, was included in a shipment of veal.

Tokyo yielded to US pressure to resume imports, ignoring consumer worries about the safety of US beef, said Japanese consumer groups. Michiko Kamiyama from Food Safety Citizen Watch and Yoko Tomiyama from Consumers Union of Japan said about this: "The government has put priority on the political schedule between the two countries, not on food safety or human health."

Sixty-five nations implemented full or partial restrictions on importing US beef products because of concerns that US testing lacked sufficient rigor. As a result, exports of US beef declined from 1,300,000 tonnes (t) in 2003 (before the first mad cow was detected in the US) to 322,000 t in 2004. This has increased since then to 771,000 t in 2007 and to 1,300,000 t by 2017.

On 31 December 2006, Hematech Inc, a biotechnology company based in Sioux Falls, South Dakota, announced it had used genetic engineering and cloning technology to produce cattle that lacked the PrP^{C} form of the major prion protein (PrP) necessary gene for prion production – thus theoretically making them immune to BSE.

In April 2012, some South Korean retailers ceased importing beef from the United States after a case of BSE was reported. Indonesia also suspended imports of beef from the US after a dairy cow with mad cow disease was discovered in California.

=== Japan ===
With 36 confirmed cases, Japan experienced one of the largest number of cases of BSE outside Europe. It was the only country outside Europe and the Americas to report non-imported cases. Reformation of food safety in light of the BSE cases resulted in the establishment of a governmental Food Safety Commission in 2003.

=== Europe ===
Evolution of the bovine spongiform encephalopathy (BSE) epidemic in the UK

Cattle are naturally herbivores, eating grasses. In modern industrial cattle-farming, though, various commercial feeds are used, which may contain ingredients including antibiotics, hormones, pesticides, fertilizers, and protein supplements. The use of meat and bone meal, produced from the ground and cooked leftovers of the slaughtering process, as well as from the carcasses of sick and injured animals, such as cattle or sheep, as a protein supplement in cattle feed was widespread in Europe prior to about 1987. Worldwide, soybean meal is the primary plant-based protein supplement fed to cattle. However, soybeans do not grow well in Europe, so cattle raisers throughout Europe turned to the cheaper animal by-product feeds as an alternative. The British inquiry dismissed suggestions that changes to processing might have increased the infectious agents in cattle feed, saying, "changes in process could not have been solely responsible for the emergence of BSE, and changes in regulation were not a factor at all" (the prion causing BSE is not destroyed by food heat treatment).

The first confirmed instance in which an animal fell ill with the disease occurred in 1986 in the United Kingdom, and lab tests the following year indicated the presence of BSE; by November 1987, the British Ministry of Agriculture accepted it had a new disease on its hands. Subsequently, 177 people (as of June 2014) contracted and died of a disease with similar neurological symptoms subsequently called (new) variant Creutzfeldt–Jakob disease (vCJD). This is a separate disease from 'classical' Creutzfeldt–Jakob disease, which is not related to BSE and has been known about since the early 1900s. Three cases of vCJD occurred in people who had lived in or visited the UK – one each in the Republic of Ireland, Canada, and the US. Also, some concern existed about those who work with (and therefore inhale) cattle meat and bone meal, such as horticulturists, who use it as fertilizer. Up-to-date statistics on all types of CJD were, until March 2025, published by the National Creutzfeldt–Jakob Disease Surveillance Unit in Edinburgh, Scotland.

For many of the vCJD patients, direct evidence exists that they had consumed tainted beef, and this is assumed to be the mechanism by which all affected individuals contracted it. Disease incidence also appears to correlate with slaughtering practices that led to the mixture of nervous system tissue with ground meat (mince) and other beef. An estimated 400,000 cattle infected with BSE entered the human food chain in the 1980s. Although the BSE epizootic was eventually brought under control by culling all suspect cattle populations, people are still being diagnosed with vCJD each year (though the number of new cases currently has dropped to fewer than five per year). This is attributed to the long incubation period for prion diseases, which is typically measured in years or decades. As a result, the full extent of the human vCJD outbreak is still not known.

The scientific consensus is that infectious BSE prion material is not destroyed through cooking procedures, meaning that even contaminated beef foodstuffs prepared "well done" may remain infectious.

Alan Colchester, a professor of neurology at the University of Kent, and Nancy Colchester, writing in the 3 September 2005 issue of the medical journal The Lancet, proposed a theory that the most likely initial origin of BSE in the United Kingdom was the importation from the Indian Subcontinent of bone meal which contained CJD-infected human remains. The government of India vehemently responded to the research, calling it "misleading, highly mischievous; a figment of imagination; absurd", further adding that India maintained constant surveillance and had not had a single case of either BSE or vCJD. The authors responded in the 22 January 2006 issue of The Lancet that their theory is unprovable only in the same sense as all other BSE origin theories are and that the theory warrants further investigation.

During the course of the investigation into the BSE epizootic, an enquiry was also made into the activities of the Department of Health Medicines Control Agency (MCA). On 7 May 1999, David Osborne Hagger, a retired civil servant who worked in the Medicines Division of the Department of Health between 1984 and 1994, produced a written statement to the BSE Inquiry in which he gave an account of his professional experience of BSE.

In February 1989, the MCA had been asked to "identify relevant manufacturers and obtain information about the bovine material contained in children's vaccines, the stocks of these vaccines and how long it would take to switch to other products". In July, "[the] use of bovine insulin in a small group of mainly elderly patients was noted and it was recognised that alternative products for this group were not considered satisfactory". In September, the BSE Working Party of the Committee on the Safety of Medicines (CSM) recommended that "no licensing action is required at present in regard to products produced from bovine material or using prepared bovine brain in nutrient media and sourced from outside the United Kingdom, the Channel Isles and the Republic of Ireland provided that the country of origin is known to be free of BSE, has competent veterinary advisers and is known to practise good animal husbandry".

In 1990, the British Diabetic Association became concerned regarding the safety of bovine insulin. The CSM assured them "[that] there was no insulin sourced from cattle in the UK or Ireland and that the situation in other countries was being monitored".

In 1991, the European Commission "[expressed] concerns about the possible transmission of the BSE/scrapie agent to man through use of certain cosmetic treatments".

In 1992, sources in France reported to the MCA "that BSE had now been reported in France and there were some licensed surgical sutures derived from French bovine material". Concerns were also raised at a CSM meeting "regarding a possible risk of transmission of the BSE agent in gelatin products".

For this failure, France was heavily criticised internationally. Thillier himself queried why there had never been a ban on French beef or basic safety precautions to stop the food chain becoming contaminated, suggesting "Perhaps because the French government forgot its role in guaranteeing the safety of food products, and this neglect cost the lives of nine people". The Sydney Morning Herald added, "while blustering French politicians blamed Britain for the emergence of the disease – and tried to quarantine the country by banning imports of British beef – they failed to adopt measures to prevent a hidden epidemic at home".

In 2016 France confirmed a further case of BSE.

In October 2015 a case of BSE was confirmed at a farm in Carmarthenshire in Wales. In October 2018, a case of BSE was confirmed at a farm in Aberdeenshire, Scotland, the first such case in Scotland in a decade. The case was believed to be an isolated one, but four other animals from the same herd were being culled for precautionary reasons. Scottish officials confirmed that the case had been identified as part of routine testing and that the diseased cow had not entered the human food chain.

A number of other countries had isolated outbreaks of BSE confirmed, including Spain, Portugal, Belgium and Germany.

==== The ban on British beef ====
The BSE crisis led to the European Union (EU) banning exports of British beef with effect from March 1996; the ban lasted for 10 years before it was finally lifted on 1 May 2006 despite attempts in May through September 1996 by British prime minister John Major to get the ban lifted. The ban led to trade disputes between the UK and other EU states, dubbed the "beef war" by media. Restrictions remained for beef containing "vertebral material" and for beef sold on the bone. France continued to impose a ban on British beef illegally long after the European Court of Justice had ordered it to lift its blockade, although it has never paid any fine for doing so.

Russia was proceeding to lift the ban sometime after November 2012 after 16 years; the announcement was made during a visit by the UK's chief veterinary officer Nigel Gibbens.

An exception was agreed for beef from Wales bound for the Dutch market, previously an important market for Northern Irish beef. Of two approved export establishments in the United Kingdom in 1999, one was in Scotland – an establishment to which live beef was supplied from Northern Ireland. As the incidence of BSE was very low in Northern Ireland – only six cases of BSE in 1999 – partly due to the early adoption of an advanced herd tagging and computerization system in the region, calls were made to remove the EU ban on exports with regard to Northern Irish beef.

Wildcat bans from countries known to have BSE were imposed in various European countries, although these were mostly subsequently ruled illegal. The Economist noted, "Unfortunately, much of the crisis in Europe can be blamed on politicians and bureaucrats. Even while some European countries were clamouring for bans on British beef, they were ignoring warnings from the European Commission about how to avoid the spread of BSE in their own herds."

== History ==
Different hypotheses exist for the origin of BSE in cattle. One hypothesis suggests it may have jumped species from the scrapie disease in sheep, and another hypothesis suggests that it evolved from a rare spontaneous form of "mad cow disease" that has been seen occasionally in cattle for many centuries. In the fifth century BC, Hippocrates described a similar illness in cattle and sheep, which he believed also occurred in humans. Publius Flavius Vegetius Renatus recorded cases of a disease with similar characteristics in the fourth and fifth centuries AD.

In more recent UK history, the official BSE inquiry (published 2000) suggested that the outbreak there "probably arose from a single point source in the southwest of England in the 1970s".

The most recent case in Britain was in May 2025, on a farm in Essex, England, and was atypical.

== See also ==
- United Kingdom BSE outbreak
- Mad cow crisis
- Variant Creutzfeldt–Jakob disease
