= United Kingdom BSE outbreak =

Mad cow disease outbreak in the 1980s and 90s

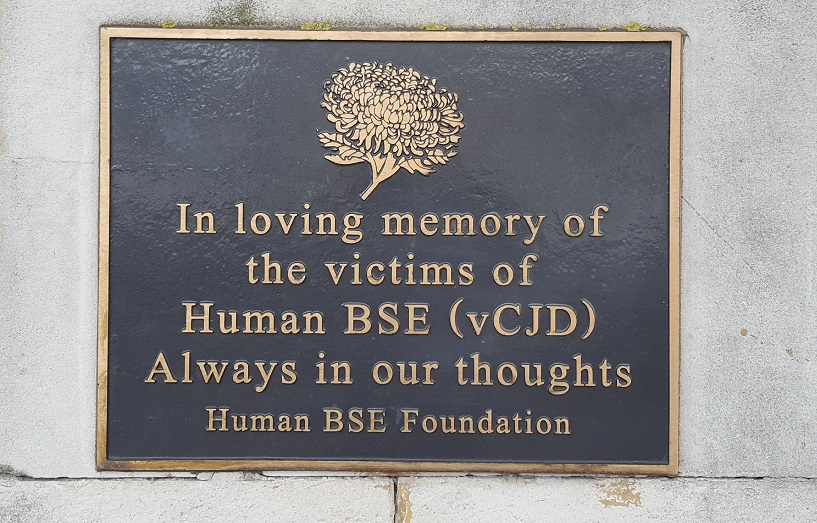
- A plaque memorialising those who died of vCJD.
- Location: United Kingdom
- Type: Disease outbreak
- Deaths: 178
- Inquiries: The BSE Inquiry

The United Kingdom was afflicted with an outbreak of bovine spongiform encephalopathy (BSE, also known as "mad cow disease"), and its human equivalent variant Creutzfeldt–Jakob disease (vCJD), in the 1980s and 1990s. Over four million head of cattle were slaughtered in an effort to contain the outbreak, and 178 people died after contracting vCJD through eating infected beef. A political and public health crisis resulted, and British beef was banned from export to numerous countries around the world, with some bans remaining in place until as late as 2019.

The outbreak is believed to have originated in the practice of supplementing protein in cattle feed by meat-and-bone meal (MBM), which used the remains of other animals. BSE is a disease involving infectious misfolded proteins known as prions in the nervous system; the remains of an infected animal could spread the disease to animals fed on such a diet.

== Background ==
=== BSE and prion diseases ===
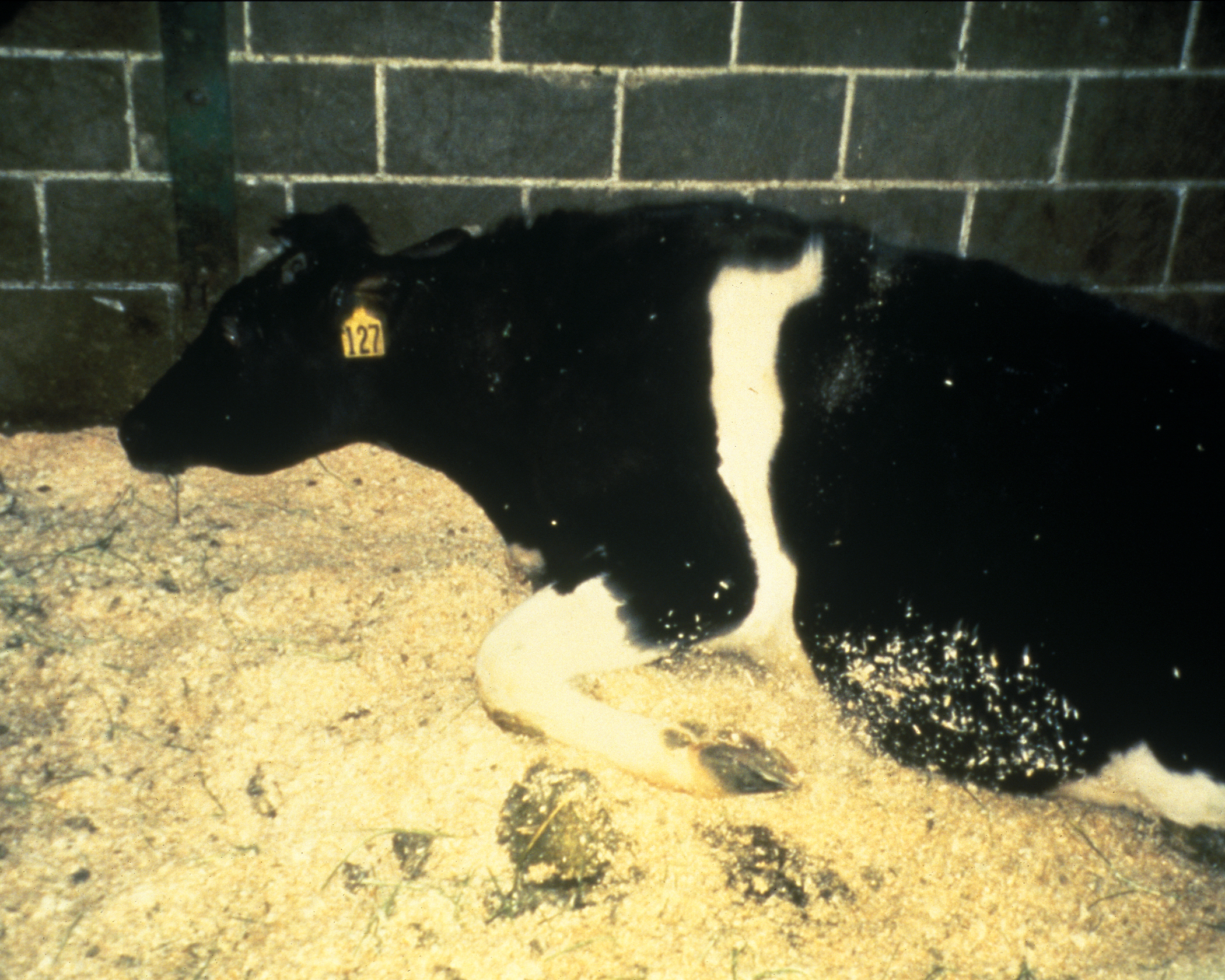
A cow with BSE which has lost her ability to stand, becoming a downer.

Bovine spongiform encephalopathy (BSE) is a neurodegenerative disease of cattle caused by misfolded proteins known as prions. Symptoms include abnormal behaviour, trouble walking, weight loss, and eventual paralysis. Prion diseases such as BSE are universally fatal; the time between infection and onset of symptoms is generally four to five years and time from onset of symptoms to death is typically weeks to months.

=== British agriculture in the late twentieth century ===
Agriculture was the leading sector of the British economy until the mid-nineteenth century, when the repeal of the Corn Laws led to an influx of imported food. Britain's reliance on food imports (partly also due to an increased population) left it strategically vulnerable during both World Wars; after World War II, it adopted protectionist policies to reduce this vulnerability and sustain rural areas, a direction that was strengthened in some respects after the country's 1973 entry to the European Economic Area provided the Common Agricultural Policy and a larger export market for farmers.

At the time of the outbreak, cattle farming was the largest sector of British agriculture, comprising up to 38 per cent of the United Kingdom's entire agricultural product, and was capable of providing the vast majority of domestic demand for beef and dairy, as well as significant exports of beef and cheese. The cattle industry had produced a breed of dairy cattle that had high milk yields when fed a high-protein diet. Feeds derived from animal sources, such as meat-and-bone meal (MBM), had been used since the early twentieth century and were found to increase milk yields more than those derived from non-animal sources such as soybeans. That dairy herds were fed such feeds more than beef herds ultimately proved immaterial since most British beef came from cattle in dairy herds.

=== Origin and spread of BSE ===
British cattle are believed to have become infected in large numbers in the 1980s through the use of MBM, which contained the remains of other animals. This included the remains of cattle which may have spontaneously developed the disease as well as sheep infected with scrapie, a similar disease in sheep; the inclusion of brain and spinal cord tissue in MBM increased the likelihood of infection.

== Timeline of outbreak ==
=== 1980s: First cases of BSE in cattle ===
Evolution of the Bovine spongiform encephalopathy (BSE) epidemic in the UK.

The earliest suspicions of BSE were on a farm in Sussex in December 1984, and the earliest confirmed case was by a post-mortem examination of a cow from the same farm in September 1985, although it was not confirmed as such until June 1987.

By November 1987, the British Ministry of Agriculture accepted it had a new disease on its hands. In 1989, high-risk offal was banned for human consumption and widespread fear about beef led many British consumers to stop purchasing it.

=== 1990–1994: Spread to other animals ===
A crucial basis for the government's assurances that British beef was safe was the belief that BSE-infected meat products would not be able to infect other animals. This was founded on their experience with scrapie-infected sheep, which had proven unable to cause any illness in humans.

However, scientists studying BSE were already questioning this assumption and, on 10 May 1990, it was widely reported that a Siamese cat named Max had become infected with BSE, providing the first confirmation outside the laboratory that BSE could in fact be transmitted between species through eating infected meat. Despite this, the government maintained that British beef was safe and, later that month, the then-Secretary of State for Environment, Food and Rural Affairs, John Gummer, appeared on television encouraging his daughter to eat a beef burger, and declared British beef to be 'completely safe'. Many more cats would go on to develop the disease, as would numerous other animals including at least one tiger in a UK zoo.

Cases of the disease in cattle continued to rise despite bans on feeding offal to cows, and peaked with 100,000 confirmed cases in 1992–1993. In an attempt to stop the spread of the disease, a total of 4.4 million cattle were slaughtered during the outbreak.

=== 1994–1996: Spread to humans ===
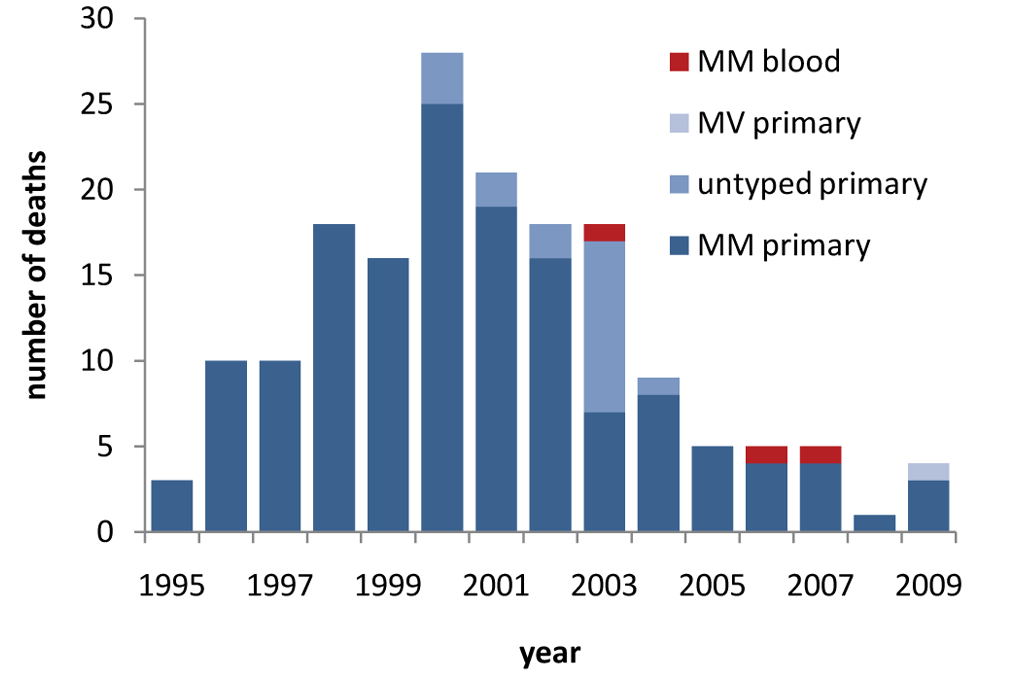
Deaths in the UK caused by vCJD from the start of the BSE outbreak up until 2009. MM and MV refer to the two genotypes of vCJD.

In late 1994, a number of people began to show symptoms of a neurological disease similar to CJD, a fatal disorder that occurs naturally in a small percentage of people, though usually only later in life. This new form of the disease would go on to be identified as variant CJD (vCJD), occurring primarily in younger people and caused through eating BSE-infected meat. The first known death from vCJD occurred on 21 May 1995, when the 19-year old Stephen Churchill died although the UK government continued to emphasise the safety of British beef and, in September 1995, concluded that there was 'insufficient evidence' to link BSE and vCJD. It was not until 20 March 1996 that Stephen Dorrell, the Secretary of State for Health announced that vCJD was linked to eating BSE-infected meat.

178 people (the latest in 2016) would go on to contract and die of the disease.

== Regulations and bans of British beef ==
When BSE was identified, the United States banned the importation of British cattle in 1989, and 499 cows who had been recently imported from the United Kingdom were killed. The United States slaughtered an additional 116 British cows in 1996.

In the United States between 1999 and 2022, people who lived or worked in, or who visited the United Kingdom, France, or Ireland, or who served at military bases in Europe between 1980 and 2001, or who received blood transfusions in those countries since 1980 were forbidden from donating blood. The over-two-decade donation ban in the United States on those people was finally lifted in 2022.

Between December 1997 and November 1999, the British government banned the sale of beef on the bone.

A week after Dorrell's announcement, on 27 March 1996, the European Union (EU) imposed a worldwide ban on exports of British beef. The ban lasted for 10 years, being lifted on 1 May 2006, although restrictions remained on British beef containing vertebral material and beef sold on the bone. The ban lead to trade disputes between the UK and other EU states, dubbed a "Beef War" by media. France continued to impose a ban on British beef illegally long after the European Court of Justice had ordered it to lift its blockade, although it has never paid any fine for doing so.

== The BSE inquiry ==
During the height of the crisis, as well as after cases began to decline, the UK government came under criticism for its response, and in particular for how slow it was to acknowledge the problem, to inform the public and to take steps to deal with the outbreak.

On 22 December 1997, an inquiry was announced in parliament to investigate the history of the outbreak and the actions taken in response. The inquiry was conducted by a committee consisting of Lord Phillips of Worth Matravers, June Bridgeman and Malcolm Ferguson-Smith.

During the inquiry, microbiologist and clinical virologist Harash Narang asserted that the link between BSE and Variant Creutzfeldt–Jakob disease (vCJD) could have been established six years earlier if research had not been stopped.

It provided its report in October 2000, and the report was published in full by Nick Brown, the secretary for agriculture at the time. The inquiry report was critical of the government, the Ministry of Agriculture, Fisheries and Food and Chief Medical Officer Sir Donald Acheson.

== Future risk ==
The original outbreak of vCJD only affected people with a particular genetic makeup; those who were methionine-homozygous at the PRNP codon 129 methionine/valine polymorphism. Studies of similar diseases in other parts of the world have shown that methionine-homozygous people tend to become ill relatively quickly in a first wave, while methionine-valine heterozygous and valine-homozygous people can be infected but remain asymptomatic for years or even decades. This has led some researchers including Graham Jackson of University College London to warn that there could be a second wave of vCJD infections years later.

In 2016, the first case of vCJD with heterozygosity at codon 129 was identified.

== See also ==
- Jonathan Simms

== Works cited ==
- Phillips, Nick; Bridgeman, June; Ferguson-Smith, Malcolm (October 2000). The BSE Inquiry (Report). Archived from the original on 2 August 2006.
- Sheen, Barbara (2005). Mad cow disease. San Diego, CA: Lucent Books. ISBN 978-1-59018-635-0 – via Archive.org.
