= John R. Clifford =

- Born: Bowling Green, Kentucky
- Occupation: Veterinarian

Dr. John R. Clifford is an American veterinarian. Since 1985 he has been with APHIS, Animal and Plant Health Inspection Service of the United States Department of Agriculture, where he held various positions including USDA Chief Veterinary Officer. Clifford received DVM and BS degrees in animal science from the University of Missouri and before joining APHIS he was a private veterinarian.
