= Meat and bone meal =

Product of the rendering industry

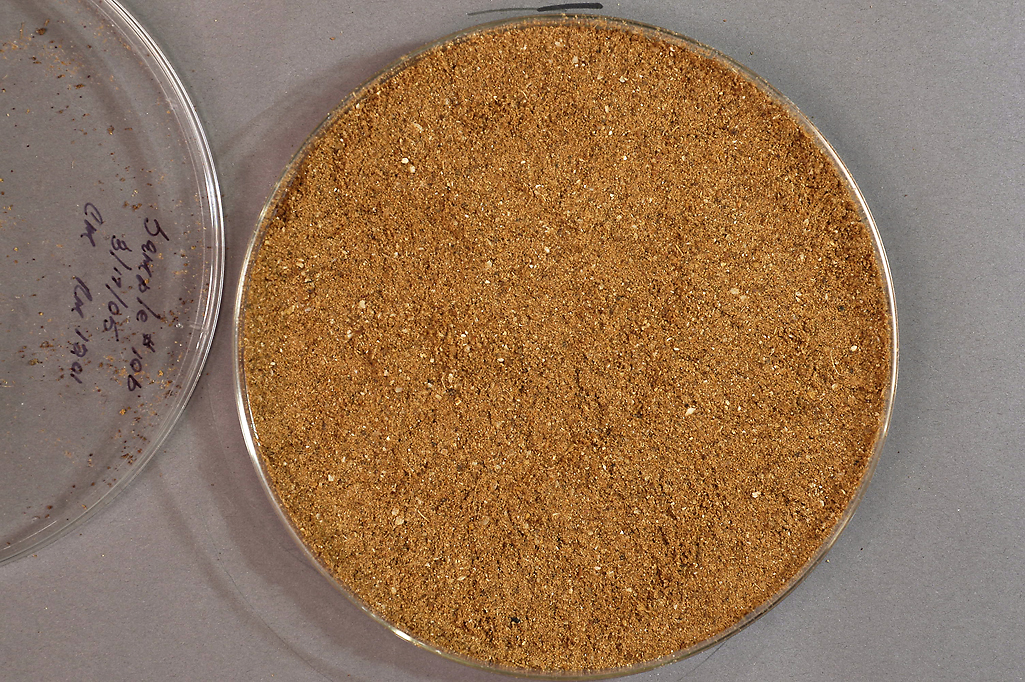
Meat and bone meal

Meat and bone meal (MBM) is a product of the rendering industry. It is typically about 48–52% protein, 33–35% ash, 8–12% fat, and 4–7% water. It is primarily used in the formulation of animal feed to improve the amino acid profile of the feed. Feeding of MBM to cattle is thought to have been responsible for the spread of BSE (mad cow disease); therefore, in most parts of the world, MBM is no longer allowed in feed for ruminant animals. However, it is still used to feed monogastric animals.

MBM is widely used in the United States as a low-cost animal protein in dog food and cat food. In Europe, some MBM is used as ingredients in pet food, but the majority is now used as a fossil-fuel replacement for energy generation, as a fuel in cement kilns, landfilling or incineration.

== History ==
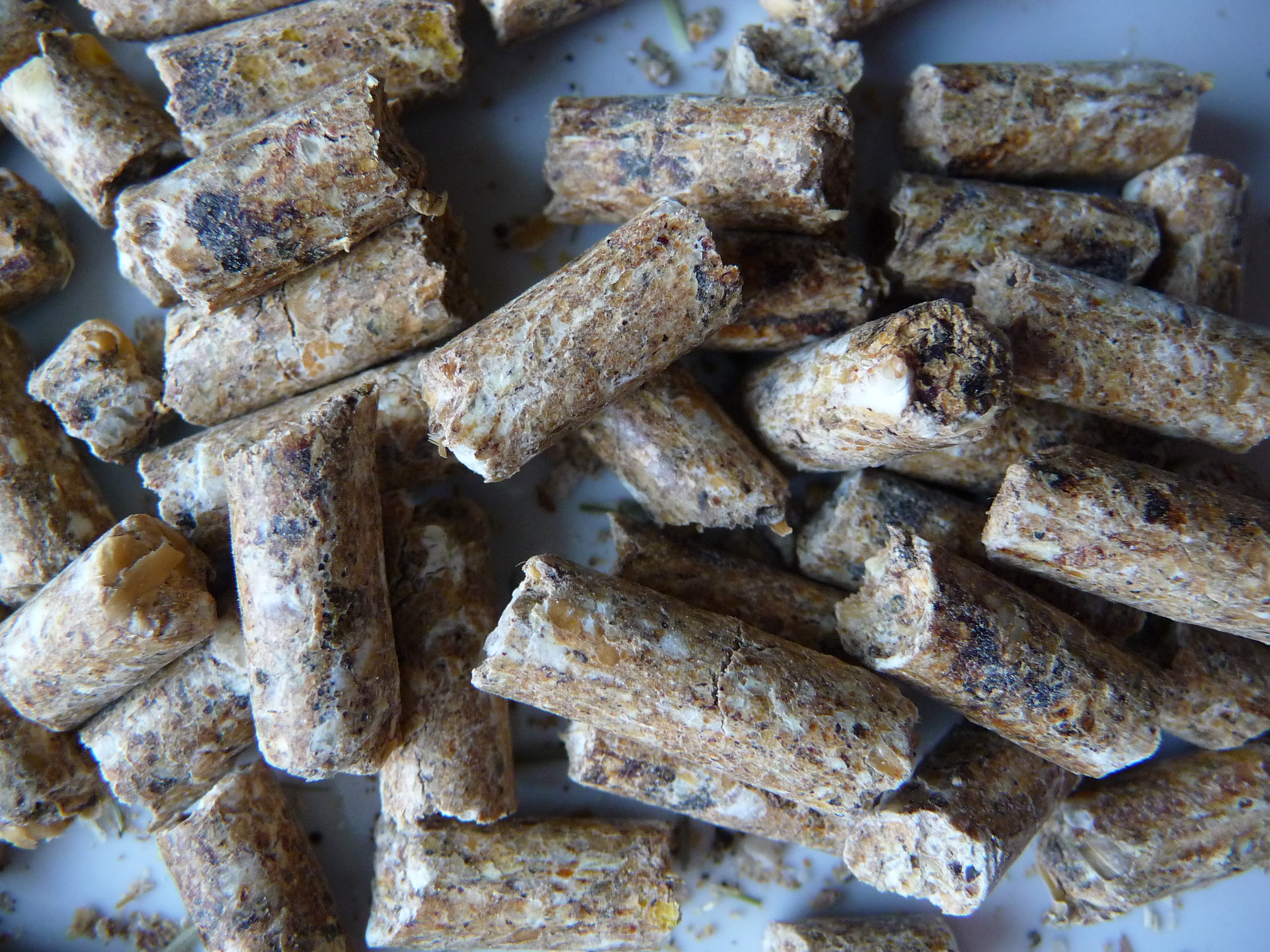
Manufactured pelleted feed ration for sheep and goats

In the UK, after the 1987 discovery that BSE could cause vCJD, the original feed ban was introduced in 1988 to prevent ruminant protein being fed to ruminants. In addition, it has been illegal to feed ruminants with all forms of mammalian protein (with specific exceptions) since November 1994 and to feed any farmed livestock, including fish and horses, with mammalian meat and bone meal (mammalian MBM) since 4 April 1996. Regulation (EC) No.999/2001 introduced EU-wide regulations, which relaxed UK controls.

In 2000, UK supermarket chain Co-op Food was still calling for "a legally-binding Europe-wide ban on the feeding of animal waste to farm animals". They opined that the practice was tantamount to cannibalism. According to the BBC at the time there was no ban on the use in livestock feed of animal blood, tallow, poultry offal and feather meal.

=== European categories ===
In Europe (before the 2002 EU Regulation), animal by-products were classified into two categories: "high risk" or "low risk" products. Since 2002, "processed animal protein" and other animal by-products, authorized or not for various uses, are categorized into three categories (by the European Regulation 2002) according to their supposed or demonstrated level of health risk.

1. Category 1 material – those that pose a prion infection risk to humans, including "SRM" ("specified risk material") and animals suspected or declared to be infected with prions. This category also contains products contaminated by certain banned substances (hormones) or dangerous for the environment (dioxins and dioxin-like compounds).
2. Category 2 materials – associated with health risks other than prions or banned chemicals. Also includes foodstuffs seized for sanitary reasons and corpses of animals who died by other means than by being slaughtered, as well as products contaminated with residues of veterinary drugs.
3. Category 3 material – from animals considered healthy and without specific risks, that is to say the carcasses have been declared fit for human consumption after health inspection. Only products in this category are allowed for the production of flours for animal feed (including pets).

== Detection ==
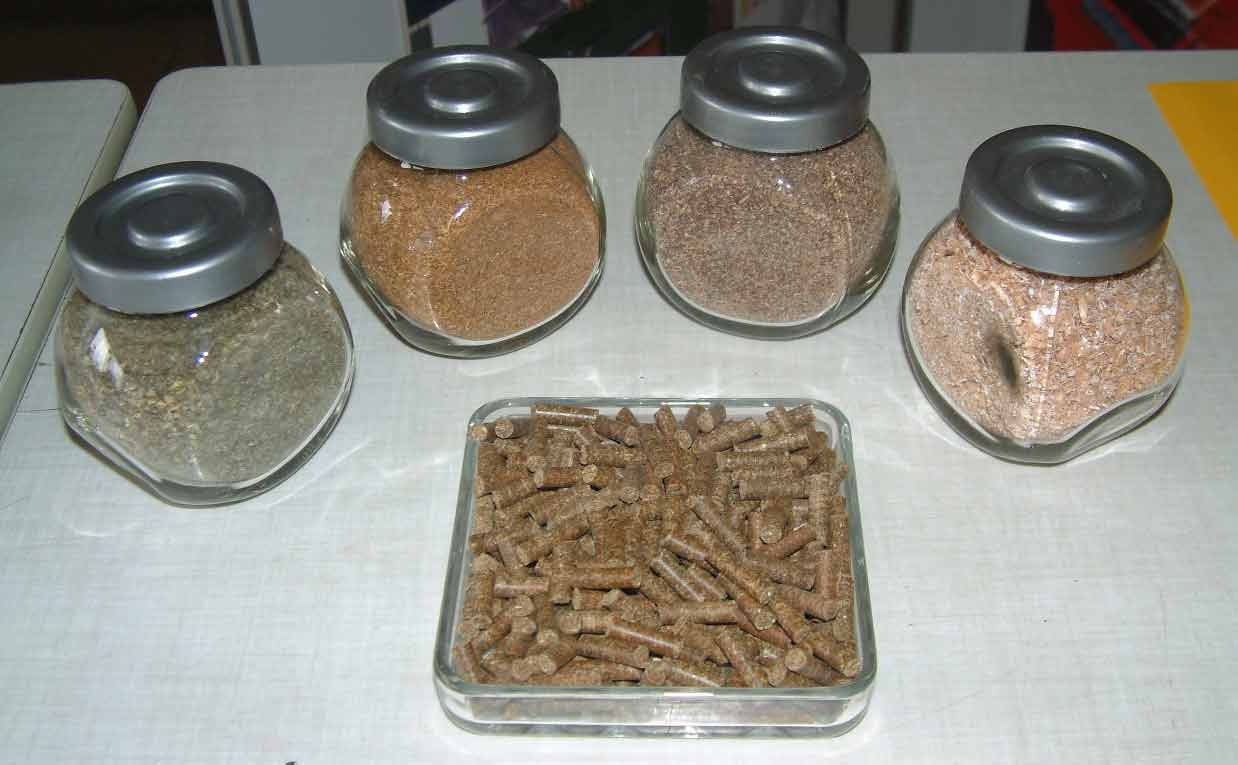
Several manufactured pelleted feed rations for horses

A minimum of 500g is required to test samples of solid or liquid material at the Irish Equine Centre, an independent not-for-profit organisation. Tests are by light microscopy and using real-time PCR for ruminant DNA. The presence of MBM and fish products in feed can be tested by light microscopy in two days. The presence of ruminant DNA in feed by real-time PCR can be detected by this lab in 48 to 72 hours.

== Uses ==
Besides use as animal feed, MBM also finds use in various areas of industry.

- Fuel – MBM is considered a renewable and even carbon-neutral source of fuel in power generation and cement kilns. Combustion destroys pathogens and pollutants. MBM has around two thirds the heat value of coal; the UK in particular widely uses meat and bone meal for the generation of renewable electricity. This was particularly prominent after many cattle were slaughtered during the BSE crisis.
- Fertilizer – MBM is used as a fertilizer. It is similar to bone meal in that it supplies calcium and phosphorus, but the meat component also provides a significant amount of nitrogen. For growing human food, the material must meet sanitary requirements to avoid spreading diseases or contaminants.

== Similar products ==
- Meat meal – obtained by cooking, defatting, sterilizing, grinding, and sifting by-products of terrestrial animals. This denomination includes both meat and bone meal (MBM) and meat meal in the strict sense, less rich in minerals than MBM; it is often referred to as "processed animal protein".
- Bone meal – produced from bones (of terrestrial animals) of second quality. The other bones can be used beforehand for the manufacture of gelatin and/or treated to produce dicalcium phosphate or ossein powder; the meal is produced by heating, defatting, drying, grinding and sieving the bones of terrestrial animals.
- Meal from skin appendages – horns, hooves and nails (around 55,700 tons per year in France) are used for example in agricultural or garden fertilizers for their sulfur, nitrogen and phosphorus contents, or used in the composition of meat meal.
- Blood meal – fresh and whole blood collected from slaughterhouses, coagulated and steam dried now often referred to as "animal protein transformed from blood".
- Feather meal – fresh feathers from slaughterhouses, treated by thermal hydrolysis (chemical decomposition in the presence of pressurized water), dried and crushed.
- Fishmeal

== See also ==
- Glanford Power Station
