= Fish protein powder =

Fish meal product for human consumption

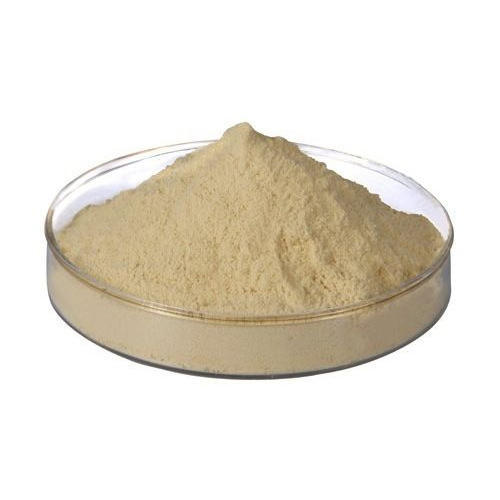
Fish Protein Powder

Fish protein powder (FPP) describes a food grade powder product designated primarily for human consumption applications. It differs significantly from fish meal products which are designated for animal feed applications. Fish protein powders have various sanitary processing, purity and functional characteristics which establish them as human food ingredients. Production plants registered for the USA market are located in Peru and France.

== History ==
Historically, the fish processing methods used for human consumption have been: fresh, canned, frozen, smoked or dehydrated - all of which would be used as a whole food rather than as an ingredient in other foods. Additionally, an industrial fish industry exists where whole fish and by products from fish processing have been cooked and dehydrated to form a product termed fish meal, which is used for animal feed, pet food and fish feed.

With the evolution of refining and processing technology and expanded research on the nutrition of fish proteins and peptides, a new industry has developed for the specific purpose of producing a fish protein powder for human consumption with the intent of reaching new ingredient uses and markets. The FPP end product is now used in a variety of food ingredient applications including sports nutrition, food additives and supplements, all of which depend on the finished fish protein powder produced such that it is hygienically safe and also meets sensory requirements of taste, odor and function in prepared foods.

== Process ==
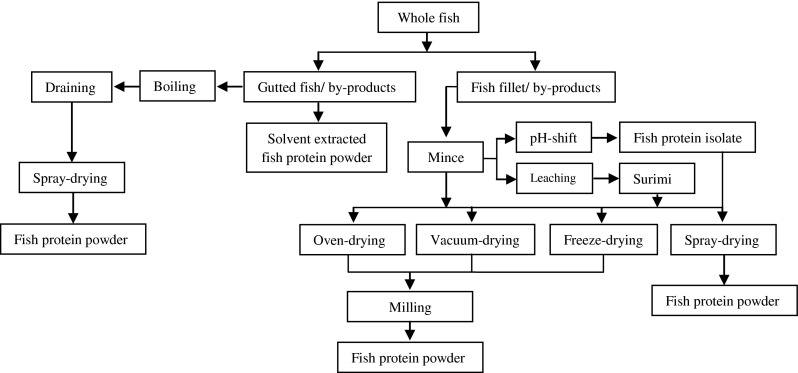
Production of fish protein powder

Enzymatic hydrolysis similar to the body's natural digestive process provides the most efficient breakdown of the proteins into smaller fractions termed peptides which can then be separated from the oil and non-digested proteins during liquid phase processing. Subsequent steps of solids and oil removal through various mechanical separation techniques are required to create a final fish protein fraction with acceptable organoleptic properties for use in human food. Minimization of odor through the elimination of fat and oil from the protein fraction, as well as separating out the lowest molecular weight protein fractions from the larger fractions all serve to create a refined fish protein. Some processes utilize solvents to extract the fat but these can result in dangerous handling and potential residual issues. The final step in producing the product is typically spray drying, which involves atomizing the liquid protein in a hot air chamber resulting in rapid evaporation of the water and a fine powder falling to the bottom of the chamber for removal.

== Categories ==
The two basic categories used to classify fish protein powders are dependent on the levels of protein, fat, mineral and carbohydrate contained in the powder. The minerals are mostly naturally occurring, organic complexes of magnesium, calcium and phosphorus. The spray drying process may utilize other minerals and carbohydrates to improve flow characteristics of the final product thus altering the natural balance. Powders will all have a residual moisture content in the 4-8% range.

- Fish protein concentrate (FPC) is a powder concentrate with medium level of protein (50-70%) and will contain some level of fat/oil (1-20%) in the powder form as well.
- Fish protein isolate (FPi) is a product containing less than 1% fat/oil and more than 90% protein.
  - New manufacturing techniques are also producing hybrid FPi products where the fat/oil content is very low, (<0.3%) with the protein levels in the 80% range. The hybrid FPi does not reach 90% protein (often a definition point for an isolate) as the natural minerals are not removed and thus represent up to 15% of the final mass balance.

== Peptides vs proteins and amino acids in the digestive tract ==
Any animal that consumes a whole protein must break down and digest the protein order to absorb the nutrients. For humans this begins with chewing and the addition of saliva enzymes, followed by acid and protease enzyme digestion in the stomach, whereby the end result is a peptide or amino acid fraction ready for uptake into the blood stream via the small intestine. Research has confirmed that most animals have more Peptide receptors in the gut and lower intestine than they do free amino acid receptors - as such the peptide form of fish protein powder is most conducive for optimal nutritional benefits.

Hygienic production of fish protein powder mimics these natural digestion steps, and pending the degree of hydrolysis, the protein powder will actually be a partial or complete peptide powder, ready for immediate absorption in the intestine.

== Nutritional aspects ==
Significant elements of the nutritional science of fish protein powders centers around the bioactive and antioxidant properties of the peptide fractions produced during hydrolysis and their ability to have a positive impact on many conditions including gastrointestinal issues associated with irritable bowel syndrome (IBS) and Crohn's disease - as well reduction effects on hypertension and fast absorption functionality promotes the addition of lean muscle mass to humans consuming the products. Further studies showed that peptides in fish protein powders can minimize injurious effects of anti-inflammatory pain drugs. The University of Maryland School of Medicine concluded that certain peptide fractions from fish may inhibit prostate cancer and possibly other cancers from spreading.

Additional benefits of fish protein powders are centered around diet needs of various subsets of the human population. Individuals who have lactose intolerance, milk allergy, gluten intolerance or coeliac disease (aka Celiac's) require alternate protein sources.

The hydrolyzed nature of fish protein powder (low molecular weight profile) leads it to be used in hypoallergenic applications such as infant formulas. There is no evidence that infants who have a high risk of having an allergy to cows milk should be fed hydrolyzed infant formula instead of breast milk for allergy prevention. For infants who have a high-risk of a cows milk allergy but cannot be fed breast milk, there is low-quality evidence suggesting that hydrolyzed protein-based formula may reduce the risk of a cows milk allergy compared to cow milk protein formula.

== Bibliography ==
- Wergedahl, H; Liaset, B; Gudbrandsen, OA; Lied, E; Espe, M; Muna, Z; Mørk, S; Berge, RK (2004). "Fish protein hydrolysate reduces plasma total cholesterol, increases the proportion of HDL cholesterol, and lowers acyl-CoA:cholesterol acyltransferase activity in liver of Zucker rats". The Journal of Nutrition. 134 (6): 1320–7. doi:10.1093/jn/134.6.1320. PMID 15173391.
- Wu, Hui-Chun; Chen, Hua-Ming; Shiau, Chyuan-Yuan (2003). "Free amino acids and peptides as related to antioxidant properties in protein hydrolysates of mackerel (Scomber austriasicus)". Food Research International. 36 (9–10): 949–957. doi:10.1016/S0963-9969(03)00104-2. INIST 15251156.
- Marchbank, T.; Limdi, J. K.; Mahmood, A.; Elia, G.; Playford, R. J. (2008). "Clinical trial: Protective effect of a commercial fish protein hydrolysate against indomethacin (NSAID)-induced small intestinal injury". Alimentary Pharmacology & Therapeutics. 28 (6): 799–804. doi:10.1111/j.1365-2036.2008.03783.x. PMID 19145735. S2CID 31397.
- Nesse, Knut Olav; Nagalakshmi, A. P.; Marimuthu, P.; Singh, Mamta (2011). "Efficacy of a Fish Protein Hydrolysate in Malnourished Children". Indian Journal of Clinical Biochemistry. 26 (4): 360–5. doi:10.1007/s12291-011-0145-z. PMC 3210250. PMID 23024471.
- Kristinsson, Hordur G.; Rasco, Barbara A. (2000). "Fish Protein Hydrolysates: Production, Biochemical, and Functional Properties". Critical Reviews in Food Science and Nutrition. 40 (1): 43–81. doi:10.1080/10408690091189266. PMID 10674201. S2CID 28085824.
- Webb, K. E.; Bergman, E. N. (1991). "Amino Acid and Peptide Absorption and Transport across the Intestine". In Tsuda, T.; Sasaki, Y.; Kawashima, R. (eds.). Physiological Aspects of Digestion and Metabolism in Ruminants: Proceedings of the Seventh International Symposium on Ruminant Physiology. San Diego: Academic Press. pp. 111–28. ISBN 978-0-323-13861-1.
