= Cat allergy =

Cat allergy may refer to:

- Allergies in cats
- Allergy to cats
