= Hydrolyzed protein =

Solution of component parts of a protein

Hydrolyzed protein is a solution derived from the hydrolysis of a protein into its component amino acids and/or peptides. Hydrolyzing down to the amino acid level is most commonly achieved using prolonged heating with hydrochloric acid. Hydrolyzing down to the peptide level can be achieved with an enzyme such as pancreatic protease to simulate the naturally occurring hydrolytic process.

== Uses ==
=== Chemistry ===
Protein hydrolysis is a useful route to the isolation of individual amino acids. Examples include cystine from hydrolysis of hair, tryptophan from casein, histidine from red blood cells, and arginine from gelatin.

=== Food ===
Protein hydrolysis release savory free amino acids (especially glutamic acid) and peptides. Hydrolyzed vegetable protein and yeast extract are commonly used as flavor enhancers (sources of umami) as a result. The non-protein components in these products also contribute to the flavor.

Protein hydrolysis also increases their digestibility and rate of digestion. Some hydrolyzed beef protein powders are used for specialized diets for athletes.

Protein hydrolysis can be used to destroy epitopes involved in recognition by antibodies involved in allergy. "An allergen must have at least 2 IgE-binding epitopes, and each epitope must be at least 15 amino acid residues long, to trigger a type 1 hypersensitivity reaction." As a result, it has been used to reduce the allergenicity of infant formula: Reducing the size of cow milk proteins in the formula makes it more suitable for consumption by babies suffering from milk protein intolerance. The US FDA has approved a label for this usage of partially-hydrolyzed proteins in 2017, but a meta-analysis published the same year shows insufficient evidence for this use.

=== Animal feed ===
Food allergies also occur in cats and in dogs. When the allergy is due to a protein in the food, the issue can be avoided by hydrolyzing the proteins into smaller components. Hydrolyzed protein is therefore used in specially formulated hypoallergenic pet foods. Partially hydrolyzed protein may also increase the development of immune tolerance. The increased protein digestibility is also potentially useful for pets with digestive issues such as inflammatory bowel disease, being in recovery from acute enteritis, and exocrine pancreatic insufficiency.

Hydrolysing a usually indigestible protein can provide an additional source of digestible protein. An example of this is hydrolyzed feather meal, made from keratin-rich waste features from the poultry industry. With partial hydrolysis, it becomes a cheap, low-carbon source of protein that is digestible by ordinary livestock and pets. Although it retains the poor amino acid profile from feather, the good digestibility and high protein content makes it a good companion to other protein sources.

=== Fertilizer ===
Hydrolyzing a protein improves the digestibility not only for animals, but also for soil microbes. As a result, it becomes useful as a fertilizer providing nitrogen and potentially also sulfur. Hydrolyzed keratin from chicken feather is the most common type, though other kinds of waste proteins (e.g. waste wool, waste fish) are also re-used this way.

Hydrolyzed protein fertilizer is considered an organic fertilizer. It contains a high amount of available nitrogen, and unlike unhydrolyzed feather meal, tends to release the nitrogen quickly. It helps the growth of soil microbes and improves soil quality.

== Issues ==
=== Bitterness ===
Partially hydrolyzed protein can contain peptides that taste bitter, as more and more hydrophobic side chains are exposed. With soy protein, maximum bitterness occur at a mean size of 2 to 4 kDa; further hydrolysis leads to reduced bitterness.

=== Incomplete epitope destruction ===
If a hydrolyzed protein for use in hypoallergenic food is not sufficiently hydrolyzed, it can still contain epitopes and trigger an allergic response.

=== Osmolarity ===
Hydrolyzed protein has higher osmolarity than the original protein. As a result, it could make the food act more like a hyperosmotic laxative and lead to diarrhea. Infant formulas with hydrolyzed protein has been blamed for causing diarrhea. Dogs and adult humans do not appear to be affected, and dogs with gastrointestinal signs of allergy do see their stool improve on hypoallergenic diets.

== See also ==
- Acceptable daily intake
- Acid-hydrolyzed vegetable protein
- E number
- Food allergy
- Food intolerance
- Food labeling regulations
- Glutamic acid
- Monosodium glutamate
- Protein allergy
