= Fish meal =

Commercial product made from fish to feed farm animals

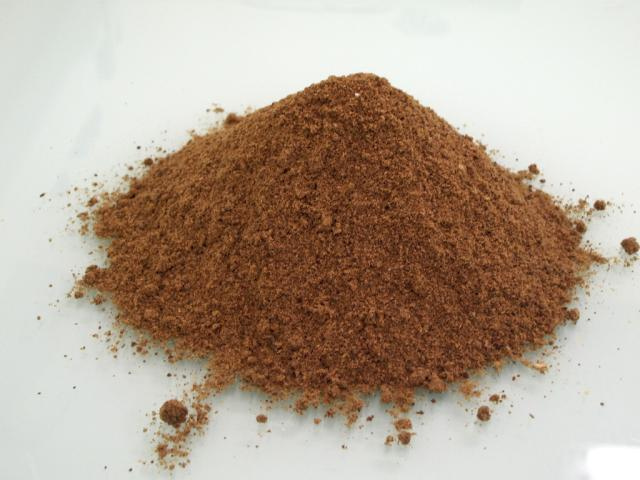
Powdered fish meal

Fish meal (sometimes spelled fishmeal) is a commercial product made from whole wild-caught fish, bycatch, and fish by-products to feed farm animals, such as pigs, poultry, and farmed fish. Because it is calorically dense, and cheap to produce, fish meal has played a critical role in the growth of factory farms and the number of farm animals it is possible to breed and feed.

Fish meal takes the form of powder or cake. This form is obtained by drying the fish or fish trimmings, and then grinding it. If the fish used is a fatty fish, it is first pressed to extract most of the fish oil.

The production and large-scale use of fish meal are controversial. The lucrative market for fish meal as a feed encourages corporate fisheries not to limit their yields of bycatch (from which fish meal is made), and thus leads to depletion of ecosystems, environmental damage, and the collapse of local fisheries. Its role in facilitating the breeding and overfeeding of millions of pigs and chickens on factory farms has also been criticized by animal rights and animal welfare groups. Manufacturers of fish meal counter that fish meal's role in the feeding and breeding of millions of farm animals leads to the production of more food and the feeding of millions of people around the world.

== History ==
Fish by-products such as fish fins, fish heads and fish scales have been used historically to feed poultry, pigs, and other farmed fish. The use of herring as an industrial raw material started as early as about 800 AD in Norway; a very primitive process of pressing the oil out of herring by means of wooden boards and stones was employed. A primitive form of fishmeal is mentioned in The Travels of Marco Polo at the beginning of the 14th century: "they accustom their cattle, cows, sheep, camels, and horses to feed upon dried fish, which being regularly served to them, they eat without any sign of dislike."

Prior to 1910, fish meal was primarily used as fertilizer In the United Kingdom. In 1913, 274 tons of herring from fisheries on Sakhalin would be used to produce fertilizer for the Japanese market.

== Current use ==
Fish meal is now primarily used as a protein supplement in compound feed. As of 2010, about 56% of fish meal was used to feed farmed fish, about 20% was used in pig feed, about 12% in poultry feed, and about 12% in other uses, which included fertilizer. Fishmeal and fish oil are the principal sources of omega-3 long-chain polyunsaturated fatty acids (eicosapentaenoic acid [EPA] and docosahexaenoic acid [DHA]) in animal diets.

The cost of 65% protein fishmeal has varied between around $385 to $554 per ton since 2000, which is about two to three times the price of soybean meal.

The rising demand for fish, as people in the developed world turn away from red meat and toward other sources of meat protein, has increased demand for farmed fish, with farmed fish accounting for half the fish consumed worldwide as of 2016. Demand for fish meal has increased accordingly, but harvests are regulated and supply cannot expand. This has led to a trend towards use of other ingredients such as soybean meal, cottonseed meal, leftovers from processing from corn and wheat, legumes, and algae, and an increase in research to find alternatives to fish meal and alternate strategic uses (for instance, in the growth phase, after newborn fish are established).

== Fish used ==
Fish meal can be made from almost any type of seafood, but is generally manufactured from wild-caught, small marine fish that contain a high percentage of bones and oil. Previously, these fish have been considered unsuitable for direct human consumption, but more recent research indicates the vast majority of fishmeal made from whole wild-caught fish is made from fish suitable for direct human consumption. Other sources of fishmeal are from bycatch and byproducts of trimmings made during processing (fish waste or offal) of various seafood products destined for direct human consumption.

The main fish sources by country are:

- Chile: Anchovy, Horse Mackerel
- China: various species
- Denmark: Pout, Sand Eel, Sprat
- European Union: Pout, Capelin, Sand Eel, Mackerel
- Iceland and Norway: Capelin, Herring, Blue Whiting
- Japan: Sardine, Pilchard, Saury, Mackerel
- Peru: Anchovy
- South Africa: Pilchard
- Thailand: various species
- United States: Menhaden, Pollock

Note: It takes four to five tons of fish to produce one ton of fish meal; about six million tons of fish are harvested each year solely to make fish meal.

== Environmental impact ==
Fish meal production is a significant contributor of over-fishing, and risks pushing fisheries beyond their replacement rate. Some areas of the world, such as Western Africa, have seen a large increase in fish meal production which in turn is hurting local fisheries and driving fisheries into collapse.

In 2022, the United Nations Food and Agriculture Organization (FAO) expressed concern about overexploitation of fish in West Africa, caused by the fish meal and fish oil industry.

== Processing ==
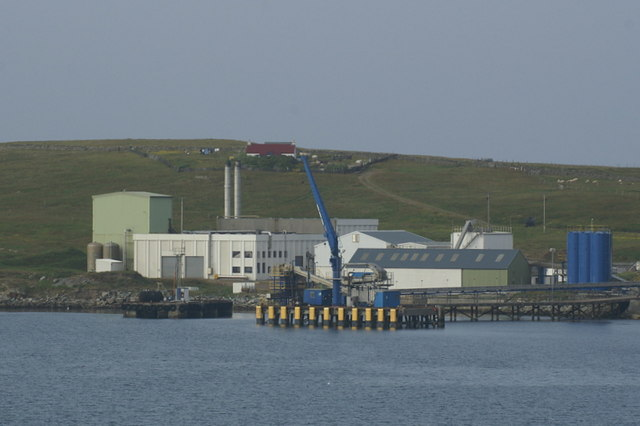
Fish meal factory, Bressay, Shetland Islands

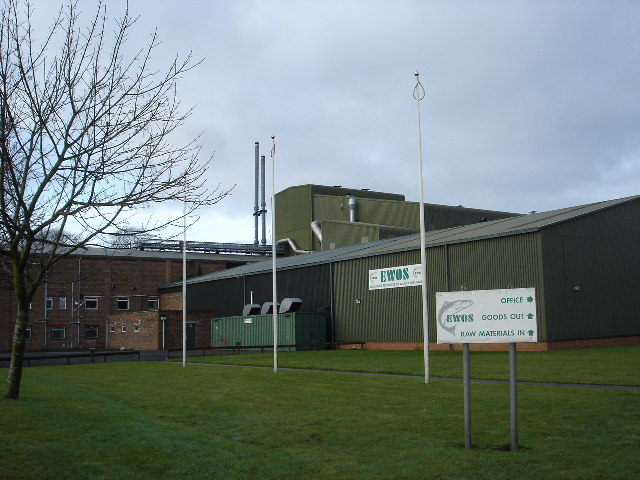
Fish meal factory, Westfield, West Lothian

Fish meal is made by cooking, pressing, drying, and grinding of fish or fish waste into a solid. Most of the water and some or all of the oil is removed.

Of the several ways of making fish meal from raw fish, the simplest is to let the fish dry out in the sun before grinding and pressing. This method is still used in some parts of the world where processing plants are not available, but the end product is poor quality in comparison with ones made by modern methods.

Today, all industrial fish meal is made by the following processes:

Cooking: The fish are moved through a commercial cooker – a long, steam-jacketed cylinder – by a screw conveyor. This is a critical stage in preparing the fish meal, as incomplete cooking means the liquid from the fish cannot be pressed out satisfactorily and overcooking makes the material too soft for pressing. No drying occurs in the cooking stage.

Pressing: The cooked fish is compressed inside a perforated tube, expelling some of its liquids, leaving "press cake". Water content is reduced from 70% to about 50% and oil down to 4%.

Drying: The press cake is dried by tumbling inside a heated drum. Under-drying may result in the growth of molds or bacteria; over-drying can cause scorching and reduction in the meal's nutritional value.

Two alternative methods of drying are used:

- Direct: Very hot air at a temperature of 500 °C (932 °F) is passed over the material as it is tumbled rapidly in a cylindrical drum. While quicker, heat damage is much more likely if the process is not carefully controlled.
- Indirect: The meal is tumbled inside a cylinder containing steam-heated discs.

Grinding: The dried fish meal is sent through a mill, typically a hammer mill, to remove any lumps or bone particles.

== Nutrient composition ==
Any complete diet must contain some protein, but the nutritional value of the protein relates directly to its amino acid composition and digestibility. High-quality fish meal normally contains between 60% and 72% crude protein by weight. Typical diets for fish may contain from 32% to 45% total protein by weight.

== Risks ==
Unmodified fish meal can spontaneously combust from heat generated by oxidation of the polyunsaturated fatty acids in the meal. In the past, factory ships have sunk because of such fires. That danger has been eliminated by adding antioxidants to the meal.

As of 2001, ethoxyquin was the most commonly used antioxidant, usually in the range of 200–1000 mg/kg. There has been some speculation that ethoxyquin in pet foods might be responsible for multiple health problems. To date, the U.S. Food and Drug Administration has only found a verifiable connection between ethoxyquin and buildup of protoporphyrin IX in the liver, as well as elevations in liver-related enzymes in some animals, but with no known health consequences from these effects. In 1997, the Center for Veterinary Medicine asked pet food manufacturers to voluntarily limit ethoxyquin levels to 75 ppm until further evidence is reported. However, most pet foods that contain ethoxyquin have never exceeded this amount. Ethoxyquin has been shown to be slightly toxic to fish.

Though it has been approved for use in foods in the US, and as a spray insecticide for fruits, ethoxyquin has not been thoroughly tested for its carcinogenic potential. Ethoxyquin has long been suggested to be a possible carcinogen, and a very closely related chemical, 1,2-dihydro-2,2,4-trimethylquinoline, has been shown to have carcinogenic activity in rats, and a potential for carcinogenic effect to fish meal prior to storage or transportation.

Globally, most of the fish meal products are characterised by possessing a certain level of plastics pollution. A recent study showed that a wide range of plastics content was found, ranging from 0 to 526.7 n/kg in samples from 26 different fish meal products, from 11 countries on four continents and Antarctica.

== See also ==
- Animal feed
- Forage fish
- Peruvian Anchoveta
- Fish protein powder
- Bone meal
- Blood meal
- Feather meal
- Meat and bone meal

== Sources ==
This article incorporates text from a free content work. Licensed under CC BY 4.0 (license statement/permission). Text taken from The State of World Fisheries and Aquaculture 2024, FAO.
