= SS Themis (1911) =

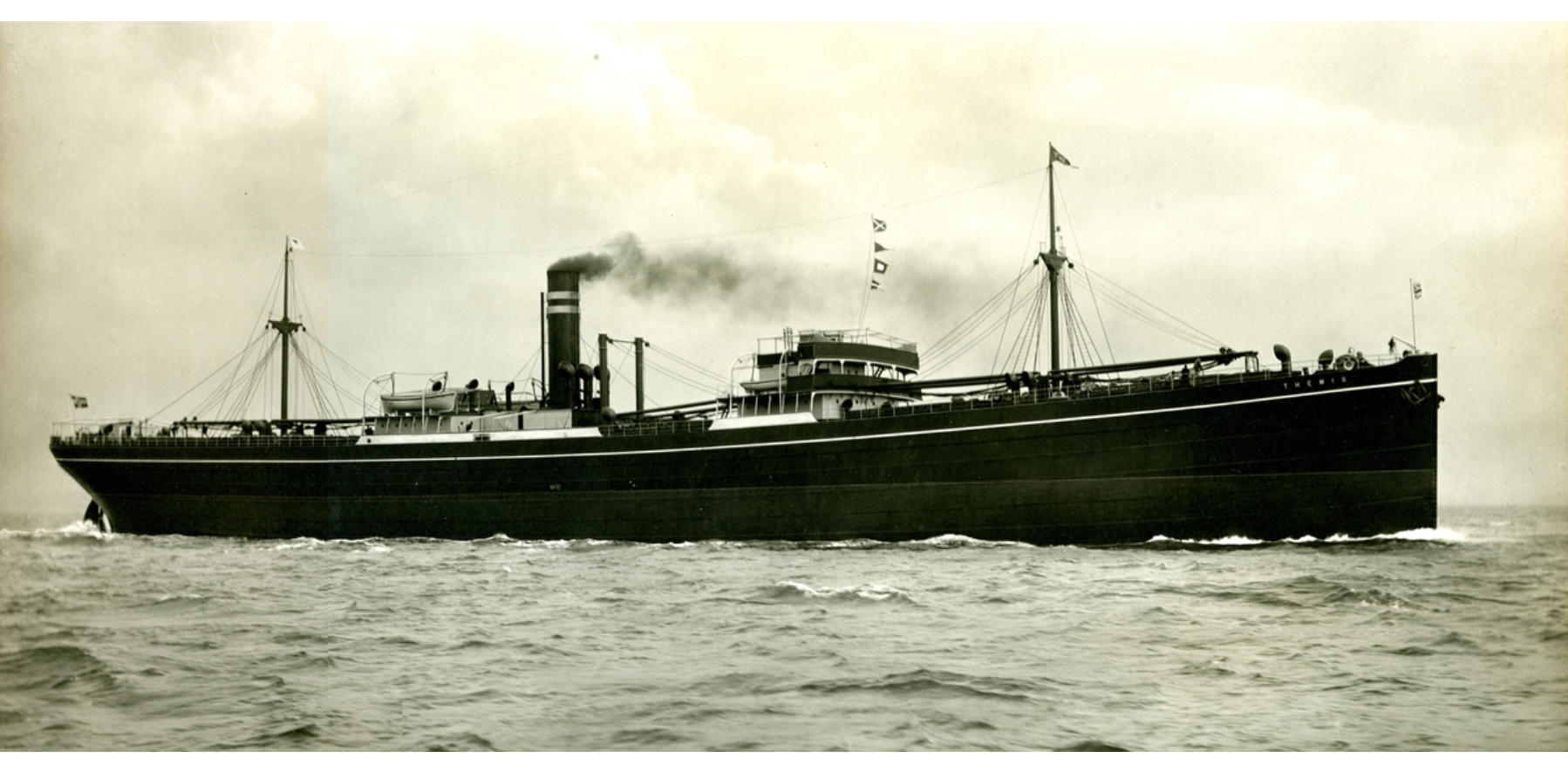

History

Norway
- Name: Themis
- Namesake: Themis
- Owner: A/S Wabanas Dampskibskompani (1911-1913); Wilhelm Wilhelmsen (1913-October 1917)
- Operator: A/S Wabanas Dampskibskompani (1911-1913); Wilhelm Wilhelmsen (1913-October 1917)
- Port of registry: Tønsberg
- Builder: William Doxford & Sons, Pallion
- Cost: NOK 1,125,925.20
- Yard number: 419
- Launched: 30 March 1911
- Christened: Themis
- Completed: 25 April 1911
- Commissioned: 28 April 1911
- Identification: code letters MGPF
- Fate: Sunk, 12 October 1917

General characteristics
- Type: Cargo ship
- Tonnage: 7,402 GRT; 4,134 NRT; 12,925 DWT
- Length: 445 ft 0 in (135.64 m)
- Beam: 60 ft 0 in (18.29 m)
- Depth: 29 ft 2 in (8.89 m)
- Installed power: 412 nhp
- Propulsion: William Doxford & Sons 3-cylinder triple expansion
- Speed: 10 knots (19 km/h; 12 mph)

Themis was a steam cargo ship built in 1911 by the William Doxford & Sons of Pallion for the Wabanas Dampskibskompani, a subsidiary of Nova Scotia Steel & Coal Company and managed by Wilhelm Wilhelmsen. She was named after Themis, Titaness of divine law and order.

== Design and construction ==
On 10 March 1911 it was reported that a new company "The Wabana Steamship Company" (Wabanas Dampskibskompani) with a capital of NOK 1,500,000 was registered in Nøtterøy with the purpose of transporting ore between Newfoundland and Europe. The new company was a subsidiary of the Nova Scotia Steel Company and was managed by Wilhelm Wilhelmsen. Two ships were leased to conduct the operations (SS Tellus and SS Themis) by the newly formed company for a period of 10 years.

The ship was laid down in 1910 at William Doxford & Sons shipyard in Pallion. The vessel was launched on 30 March 1911 (yard number 419), the sea trials were held on 25 April 1911 (28 April according to Norwegian source) with the ship being able to reach speed of 11.8 knots (13.6 mph; 21.9 km/h). After completion of her sea trials, the ship was delivered to her owner on the same day.

As built, the ship was 445 feet 0 inches (135.64 m) long between perpendiculars and 60 feet 0 inches (18.29 m) abeam, a mean draft of 29 feet 2 inches (8.89 m). Themis was assessed at 7,402 gross register tons (GRT), 4,134 net register tons (NRT) and 12,925 tons deadweight (DWT) which made her the largest ship in Scandinavia at the time, slightly larger than her sister ship Tellus. The vessel had a steel hull, and a single 412-nominal horsepower triple-expansion steam engine, with cylinders of 27 1/2-inch (70 cm), 45 1/2-inch (116 cm), and 76-inch (190 cm) diameter with a 51-inch (130 cm) stroke, that drove a single screw propeller, and moved the ship at up to 10 knots (19 km/h; 12 mph).

== Operational history ==
On 21 March 1910 Themis was chartered to Nova Scotia Steel & Coal Company for a period of nine consecutive navigation seasons (April through December) for a fee of £2,031.5 per calendar month starting in 1911. On 24 March 1910 Themis was also chartered to Gans Steamship Company for nine consecutive winter seasons for a fee £1,562.10 per calendar month, starting in 1911 as well.

After completion Themis proceeded directly to North America and arrived at Wabana on 11 May 1911. During her maiden trip in May 1911 the ship brought 12,500 tons of ore from Wabana to Philadelphia. Themis continued operating on Wabana-Philadelphia route for the remainder of 1911. For example, in August 1911 she managed to make three trips from Wabana, bringing a total of 37,560 tons of iron ore to Port Richmond.

After the close of navigation Themis was chartered by The Spanish-American Iron Company, a subsidiary of Pennsylvania Steel Company, to transport iron ore from Felton in Cuba to Philadelphia and Baltimore throughout December 1911 and early spring of 1912. The ship departed for her first trip on 26 November 1911 and finished her charter on 24 April 1912. During this service the ship brought in over 100,000 tons of ore in 10 trips. For example, on 19 December 1911 the ship unloaded 11,000 tons of ore at Sparrow's Point in record time. In a similar fashion the ship brought and unloaded 10,900 tons of Cuban ore at Sparrow's Point on 12 April 1912. On 25 April 1912 the ship sailed for Wabana to resume her summertime ore carrying to Philadelphia which continued until the end of navigation season in early November.

On 7 November 1912 Themis departed Philadelphia for Tampa arriving there on 13 November. There she loaded 3,073 tons of phosphates for transportation to Antwerp before continuing to New Orleans. After loading cargo, the vessel left New Orleans on 26 November, but ran aground next day damaging her forepeak. Nevertheless, Themis pressed on with her journey and arrived in Antwerp on 20 December with a leaking forepeak and some damage about her deck caused by storms she encountered during her trip. The ship left Antwerp on 5 January 1913 to Savannah via Cardiff arriving there on 7 February. 16,000 bales of cotton were loaded onto the ship in Savannah and she sailed out on 14 February for Bremen. After unloading, the ship then proceeded back to Wabana via Newcastle to resume ore transportation to Philadelphia until October 1913. On 10 October 1913 Themis left Wabana for Rotterdam and continued serving this route for the remainder of 1913.

On 10 January 1914 Themis departed New York City for Marseille, arriving there on 30 January. After her return to the US, the ship loaded 1,652 tons of phosphate pebble at Tampa on 10 March and 5,500 tons more at Boca Grande on 14 March, then proceeding to Galveston and Savannah, where 13,450 bales of cotton were loaded on 24 March. Themis departed from Pensacola to Bremen on 25 March, and arrived in Germany on 16 April. After unloading at Bremen, the vessel sailed on to Wabana and resumed her ore shipments to Rotterdam through mid-August 1914. After arrival in Wabana on 27 August, the vessel loaded ore and proceeded to Philadelphia arriving there on 3 September, and from there continuing to Norfolk in ballast.

After the start of World War I Themis could no longer be involved in her transatlantic ore trade, as the main consumer of her cargo was Germany. She became a tramp ship and was chartered for any cargo that she could carry. She was chartered to carry coal and departed Norfolk on 10 September to Piraeus, arriving there on 1 October. The ship then was chartered for one more trip, leaving New York on 26 December 1914 and arriving at Copenhagen on 18 January 1915. On 31 March 1915 Themis together with several other Wilhelm Wilhelmsen's ships was sub-chartered by Nova Scotia Steel & Coal Company to Barber Line for a period of eight months for a fee of £7,680 per calendar month. The vessel was handed over to Barber Line on 28 April 1915, and departed shortly thereafter for South America, visiting ports of Buenos Aires and Montevideo, returning to Boston on 12 August 1915.

On 12 September 1915 Themis departed New York for Wellington, Sydney, Melbourne and other Australian ports carrying 11,000 tons of cargo, the majority of which was case oil (including 24,000 cases for New Zealand) consigned for the Vacuum Oil Company. The ship reached the Panama Canal on 21 September, by which time the slides occurred on the canal and delayed her until 4 October, at which point the Canal was closed indefinitely. Themis was ordered to proceed to Australia via the Cape route, arriving at Durban on 8 November. After re-coaling, the ship continued on to her destination reaching Wellington on 13 December. Themis then proceeded to Australia and visited several ports until her departure on 23 February 1916 from Newcastle for South America. The vessel arrived at Montevideo on 3 April, continued on to Buenos Aires two days later where she loaded among other things 8,341 bags of dried blood for New York. The ship arrived in New York on 5 May 1916 and after unloading was immediately chartered for cargo delivery to China. About 10,500 tons of cargo was loaded onto the vessel, including 200,000 cases of oil and 500 bales of cotton. The ship left New York on 21 June, passed through the Panama Canal on 2 July, arriving at Hankow on 25 August 1916. From there the ship continued on to Shanghai, and then to Philippines where she loaded 11,250 tons of sugar for delivery to New York.

On 21 November 1916 Themis on a passage from Iloilo for New York City grounded on the outer end of the West Breakwater in Bahía Limon right after leaving the Panama Canal for sea. The ship laid with her bow aground until the afternoon of 25 November while the divers patched the holes in her hull and bulkheads. She was then pulled off and towed stern first into port of Cristóbal to discharge the remaining cargo, before being put into drydock at Balboa for repairs on 10 December. About 2,000 tons of sugar were lost in the accident. The repair work was finalized on 22 December and the vessel proceeded through the Canal on 24 December to reload her cargo. Themis finally departed the Canal area on 1 January 1917 after reloading was completed.

On 14 February 1917 Themis left Baltimore with a load of acid phosphate bound for Rotterdam. From there the ship sailed to India where she loaded wheat cargo for transportation to Marseilles.

=== Sinking ===
Themis sailed from Karachi early in the morning on 7 September 1917 carrying 11,000 tons of wheat, 260 tons of St John's bread and some other general cargo for Marseilles via the Suez Canal. The ship was under command of Captain Erling Jacobsen and had a crew of 36 men. Approximately at 01:00 of 11 October 1917, the vessel departed Malta escorted out of harbor by 4 British patrol boats. At around 07:30 on 12 October 1917 in an approximate position 37°23′N 11°05′E, about 20 nautical miles (37 km) north off Cape Bon the ship was suddenly hit by a torpedo on her starboard side, around the No.3 hold. The ship started listing on her starboard side almost immediately and Captain Jacobsen ordered the crew to stop the engines and abandon ship. The lifeboats were lowered, and the crew left the ship in an orderly fashion. Shortly, two British escort vessels appeared, HMT Portsmouth among them, and started assisting the crew. All 37 men boarded Portsmouth who took them to Bizerta where they arrived around 22:30 on the same day. The crew later was transferred to French warship Saint Louis where they were provided with temporary accommodations. Themis sank stern first around 12:15 in an approximate position 37°20′N 11°04′E. It was later discovered that the torpedo was launched by German submarine UB-51.
