= Blood meal =

Powder made from blood

Blood meal is a dry, inert powder made from blood, used as a high-nitrogen organic fertilizer and a high protein animal feed. By weight, blood meal is generally 12% nitrogen, with trace amounts (≤1%) of phosphorus and potassium. It is one of the highest non-synthetic sources of nitrogen. It usually comes from cattle or hogs as a slaughterhouse by-product.

== Uses ==
=== Dietary supplement ===
Blood meal can be used as a livestock dietary supplement and is mainly added to supply dietary lysine for cattle, fish and poultry. Molasses is sometimes added to the feed prior to use.

Feeding blood products to ruminants (such as cattle and sheep) is illegal in the United Kingdom and European Union, partially due to risk of the spread of transmissible spongiform encephalopathies.

=== Organic fertilizers ===
Blood meal, bone meal, and other animal by-products are permitted in certified organic production as soil amendments, though they cannot be fed to organic livestock. Blood meal is different from bone meal; blood meal contains a higher amount of nitrogen, while bone meal contains phosphorus. Alternatives to blood meal include feather meal and alfalfa meal. Blood meal is sometimes used as a composting activator.

=== Pest control ===
Blood meal can be spread on gardens to deter animals considered pests, who smell the blood and are repelled by the odor.

== Classifications ==
- It is a proteinaceous concentrate according to classifications of feed.
- It is a protein-yielding feedstuff according to classifications of feedstuffs.

== Processing ==
Blood needs to be dried before being used as blood meal. Several drying methods are available: solar drying, oven drying, drum drying, flash drying or spray drying.

Blood meal is sometimes made from fish (this type of blood meal is categorized as a type of fish meal) that is mixed with bone meal (often labeled as "bone + blood meal"), and other types. These types depend on the source and processing of the blood meal.

== See also ==
- Blood as food
- Bone ash
- Bone meal
- Hydroponics § Organic hydroponic solutions
- Taboo food
