= Flea allergy dermatitis =

Skin disease of dogs and cats

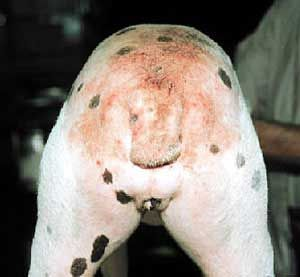
Dog with flea allergy dermatitis and secondary folliculitis

Flea allergy dermatitis is an eczematous itchy skin disease of dogs and cats. For both of these domestic species, flea allergy dermatitis is the most common cause of skin disease. Affected animals develop allergic reactions to chemicals in flea saliva. Symptoms of this reaction include erythema (redness), papules (bumps), pustules (pus-filled bumps), and crusts (scabs). If severe, hair loss will occur in the affected area. Dogs with flea allergy dermatitis often show hair loss and eczematous skin rash on the lower back, upper tail, neck, and down the back of the legs. Cats with flea allergy dermatitis may develop a variety of skin problems, including feline eosinophilic granuloma, miliary dermatitis, or self-inflicted alopecia from excessive grooming.

== Cause ==
The flea found most commonly on both dogs and cats with a flea infestation is the cat flea, Ctenocephalides felis. Flea allergy dermatitis is a hypersensitive reaction to antigens in the saliva of fleas. In some individuals just a single bite that cause a reaction.

== Symptoms ==
Animals with a hypersensitivity to flea saliva will develop a dermatitis characterised by pruritus, papules, self-induced partial alopecia, and crusted skin in cats. Lesions develop on the medial hind limbs and the dorsal posterior area.

== Diagnosis ==
The diagnosis of flea allergy dermatitis is complicated by the grooming habits of pets. Cats in particular are very efficient at grooming out fleas, often removing any evidence of infestation. Fleas begin biting within 5 minutes of finding a host, and there are no flea treatments that kill fleas before biting occurs.

== Treatment ==
The aim of treatment is to relieve the allergy-induced itch and to remove the fleas from the pet and its home environment. The majority of animals will lose their hypersensitivity to the antigen in flea saliva. In severe cases or to relieve symptoms more quickly, a pulicide is used. To treat the symptoms corticosteroids are used.

== See also ==
- Dog skin disorders
- Cat skin disorders
