= Liquid plant manure =

Fermented extract of plant material

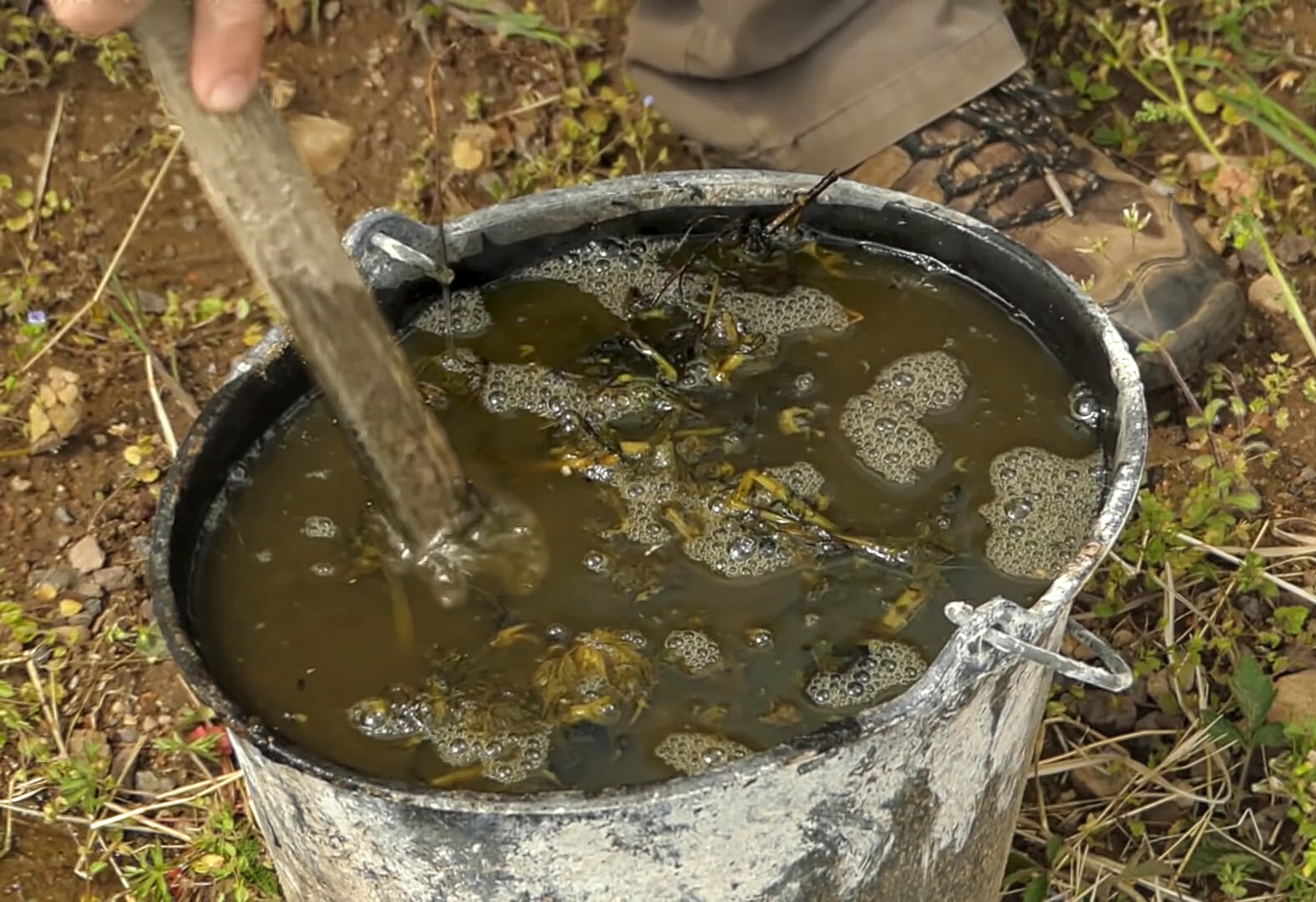
Nettle water preparation

Liquid plant manures are fermented or macerated extracts of plant material used primarily as fertilizers, and also for pest control, plant strengthening, and other phytosanitary purposes. These extracts are applied to gardening surfaces in order to supply nutrients and to improve the structure and nutrient holding capacity of soil. They are distinct from liquid manure, which is animal-derived. The best-known type is nettle water, made from stinging nettles (Urtica dioica). Other preparations use comfrey (Symphytum officinale) or field horsetail (Equisetum arvense). Their use is associated with organic gardening and smallholder agriculture.

== History ==
The use of decomposed plant material as fertiliser has a long history. The benefit of these practices for plant nutrition and soil health has been recognised for centuries.

Although the use of liquid plant manure as a phytosanitary input is sometimes also described as having a long history, written traces of this practice are only found in recent publications. A literature review by the National Horticultural Society of France (SNHF) shows references only for the late 1990s and onwards and concludes that the phytosanitary use of water-based plant material is quite recent. According to same review, the application of nettle-based products for phytosanitary purposes cannot be shown scientifically to be beneficial.

== Preparation ==
Liquid plant manures are made by submerging fresh or wilted plant material in water and allowing the mixture to ferment over several weeks. The resulting liquid is strained and diluted before application, typically at ratios of 1:10 to 1:20 with water for soil drenching, and at higher dilutions for foliar spraying.

The traditional preparations use open-air fermentation with frequent stirring to oxygenate the mixture. However, Éric Petiot, author of a widely used French reference work on the subject, has argued that anaerobic fermentation — avoiding all contact with oxygen — produces a less malodorous product.

=== Other extraction methods ===
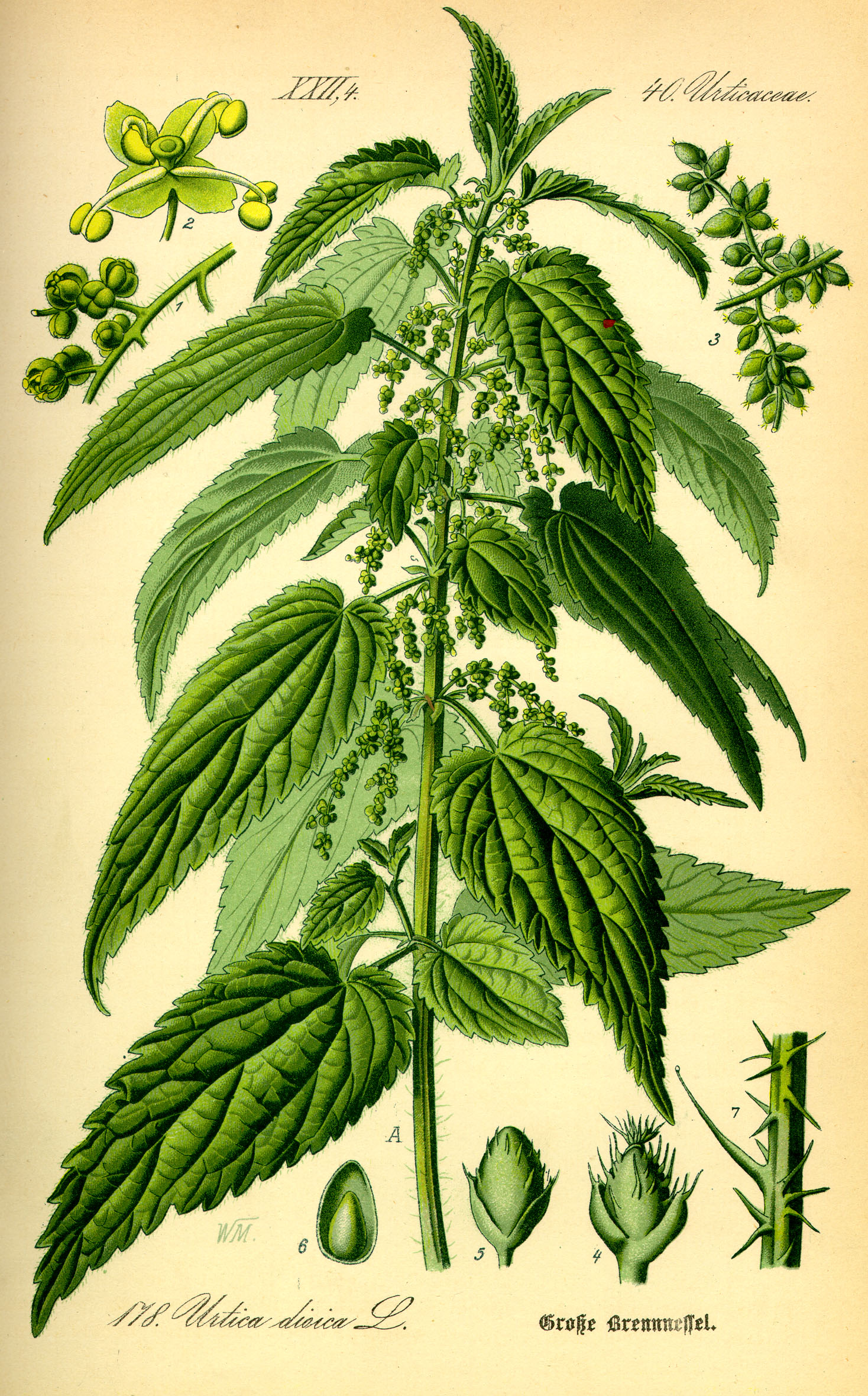
Stinging nettle (Urtica doica) Illustration by Otto Wilhelm Thomé (1885)

The water-based extraction of the benefits of plant material can also take other forms:

- decoctions – wormwood, garlic, chamomile, walnut, and elderberry;
- infusions – epazote, lantana, and tansy;
- macerations (1 to 2 days) – pyrethrum (many commercially available preparations with recognized effectiveness are approved for use in organic farming), tobacco (although the use of nicotine, and therefore tobacco extract, as an insecticide is prohibited), and rhubarb.

=== Commonly used plants ===
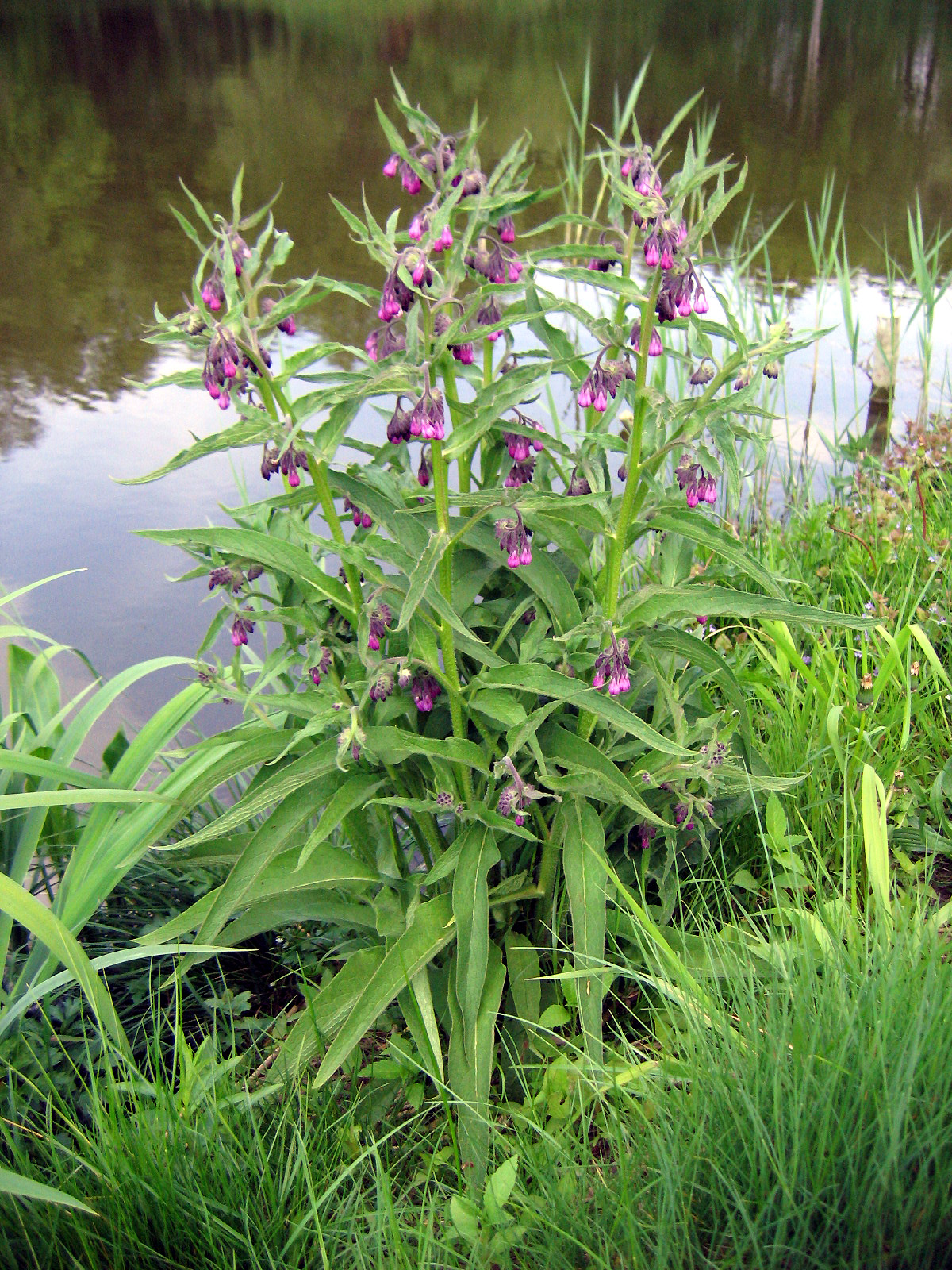
Common comfrey (Symphytum officinale), growing on the bank of a pond

Plants commonly used in liquid plant manure mixtures include:

- Nettles contain nitrogenous compounds, so are used as a compost activator or can be used to make a liquid fertilizer, which although low in phosphate, is useful in supplying magnesium, sulphur, and iron. They are also one of the few plants that can tolerate, and flourish in, soils rich in poultry droppings.
- Comfrey has high potassium content, making it particularly useful for flowering and fruiting plants — a complementary role to nettle’s nitrogen emphasis. The leaves are rich in potassium, which supports flowering and fruiting, along with nitrogen and phosphorus.
- Horsetail (E. arvense) has been approved for use as a fungicide in the European Union and the United Kingdom (since Brexit). An acqueous extract of horsetail can be used to prevent fungal pathogens on crops.

== Uses ==
Liquid plant manures are used as follows:

- Soil drench — Diluted liquid is poured around the base of plants to deliver nutrients to the root zone.
- Foliar spray — A diluted solution is sprayed onto leaves, providing nutrients or in order to deter pests. Foliar applications should be avoided in direct sunlight to prevent leaf scorch.
- Compost activator — Small quantities can be added to compost heaps to accelerate decomposition.

== Political and regulatory situation ==
In 2017, the EU authorised the use of nettles (Urtica spp.) as a starting material for the production of commercial plant protection products.

In France, the introduction of new agricultural framework legislation in 2006 triggered a major controversy, the so-called "nettle manure war". The law banned the possession, marketing and advertising of unapproved plant protection products. Intended as a stricter legislation for conventional plant protection products and especially to better control banned products, this legislation also covered plant manures and other selfmade preparations that had never passed an official evaluation or approval process. It was widely seen as a lobbying success for agroindustry and a grotesque culmination of continued attacks on smallholder agriculture. A case involving agriculturist Éric Petiot, who was prosecuted by the General Directorate of Competition, Consumption and Repression of Frauds (DGCCRF) for co-authoring a popular book on plant manures, attracted public attention. The stinging nettle became the symbol of a movement and as a symbolic protest, activists distributed nettle water, for example, at weekly markets. The Ministry of Agriculture lifted the ban in April 2011.

In Germany, the ingredients for certain liquid plant manures or the respective plant extracts are listed by the Federal Office of Consumer Protection and Food Safety as plant strengthening agents and are commercially available from several manufacturers.

== See also ==
- Organic fertilizer
- Compost
