= Psychogenic alopecia =

Compulsive behavior that affects domestic cats

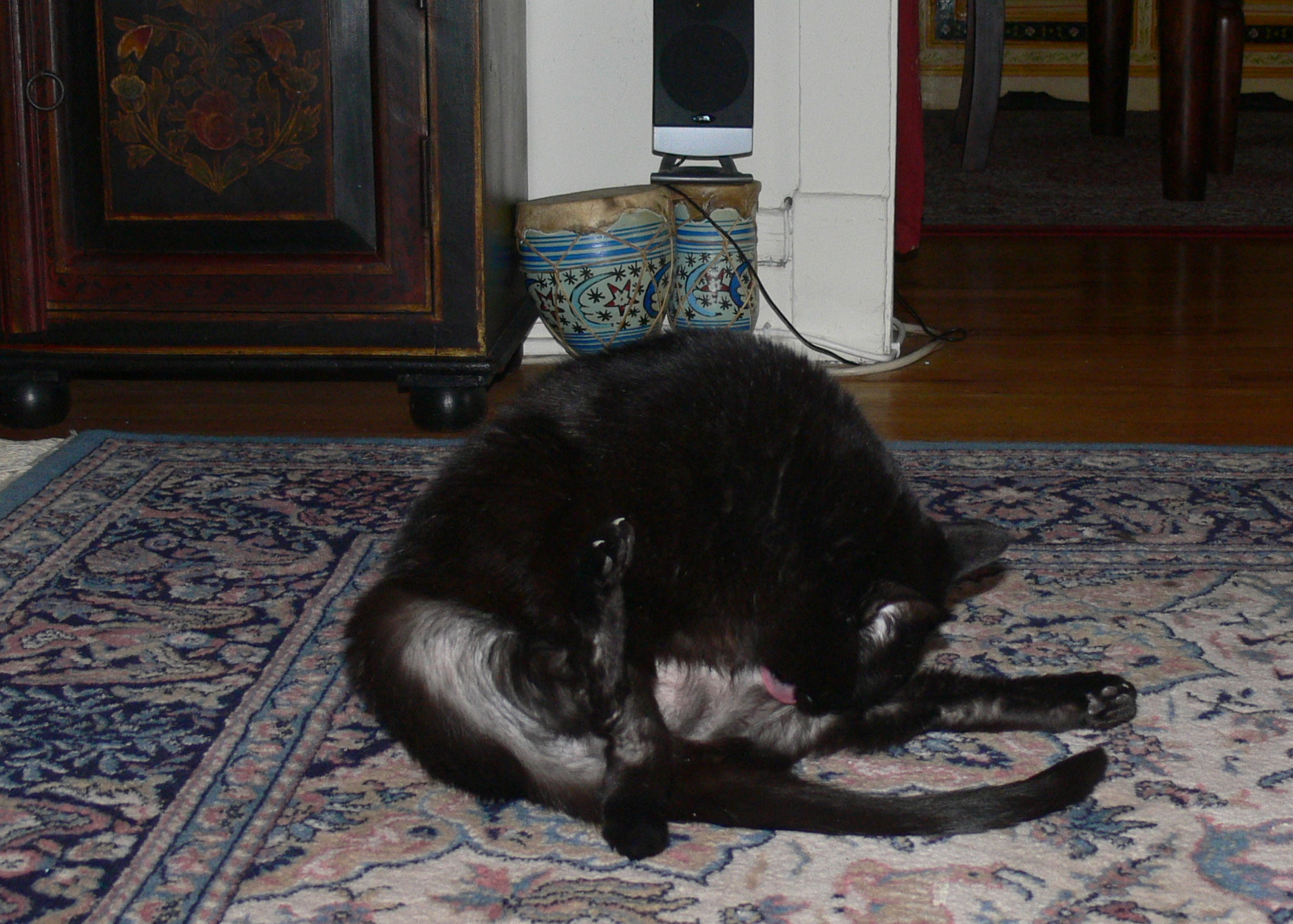
A cat exhibiting psychogenic alopecia (excessive grooming). Resulting baldness is noticeable around the abdomen, flank, and legs.

Psychogenic alopecia, also called over-grooming or psychological baldness, is a compulsive behavior that affects domestic cats. Generally, psychogenic alopecia does not lead to serious health consequences or a decreased lifespan.

== Causes ==
Grooming is a natural behavior for cats. Cats spend 5–25% of their waking hours grooming. Grooming becomes excessive when it takes precedence over other activities or no longer seems functional. Excessive grooming, which can lead to hair loss, skin wounds, and ulceration, can result from chronic stress or develop in cats who already exhibit nervous temperaments. Even when the source of stress is resolved or removed, excessive grooming may continue. There may be some genetic basis for the behavior, and it predominantly affects purebred cats of oriental breeds, but can develop in any feline. Female cats appear more susceptible. Environmental factors suspected of causing over-grooming include flea allergy, boredom, food allergy, dust or pollen causing an allergic reaction, constipation and urinary tract infection caused by avoidance of a dirty litter tray, dermatitis, and anxiety caused by inconsistent meal times. Deprivation of sunlight could be the part of the problem for indoors only cats.

== Symptoms ==
Areas affected are those the cat can access most easily, including the abdomen, legs, flank, and chest.

- Baldness, usually beginning with the abdomen.
- Obvious over-grooming (although some cats may only engage in the behavior in the absence of owners).
- Redness, rashes, pus, scabs on the bald area or areas traumatized by over-grooming.
- A highly irritable cat may even cut its face with the claw of its hind foot if over-zealously scratching the back of its head.

== See also ==
- Cat flea
- Cat health
- Cat skin disorders
- Feather-plucking
- Trichotillomania: a compulsive hair-pulling behavior in humans that can cause hair loss
