= James Robertson (moderator) =

Scottish minister

James Robertson FRSE (1803–1860) was a Scottish minister who served as Moderator of the General Assembly of the Church of Scotland. He was also a noted chemist.

== Life ==
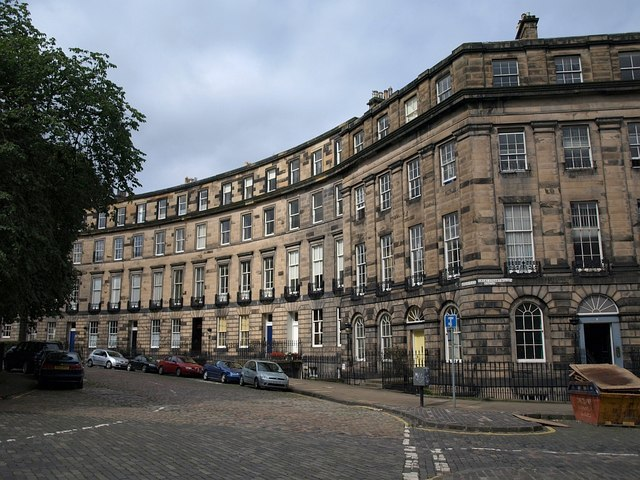
Ainslie Place, Edinburgh

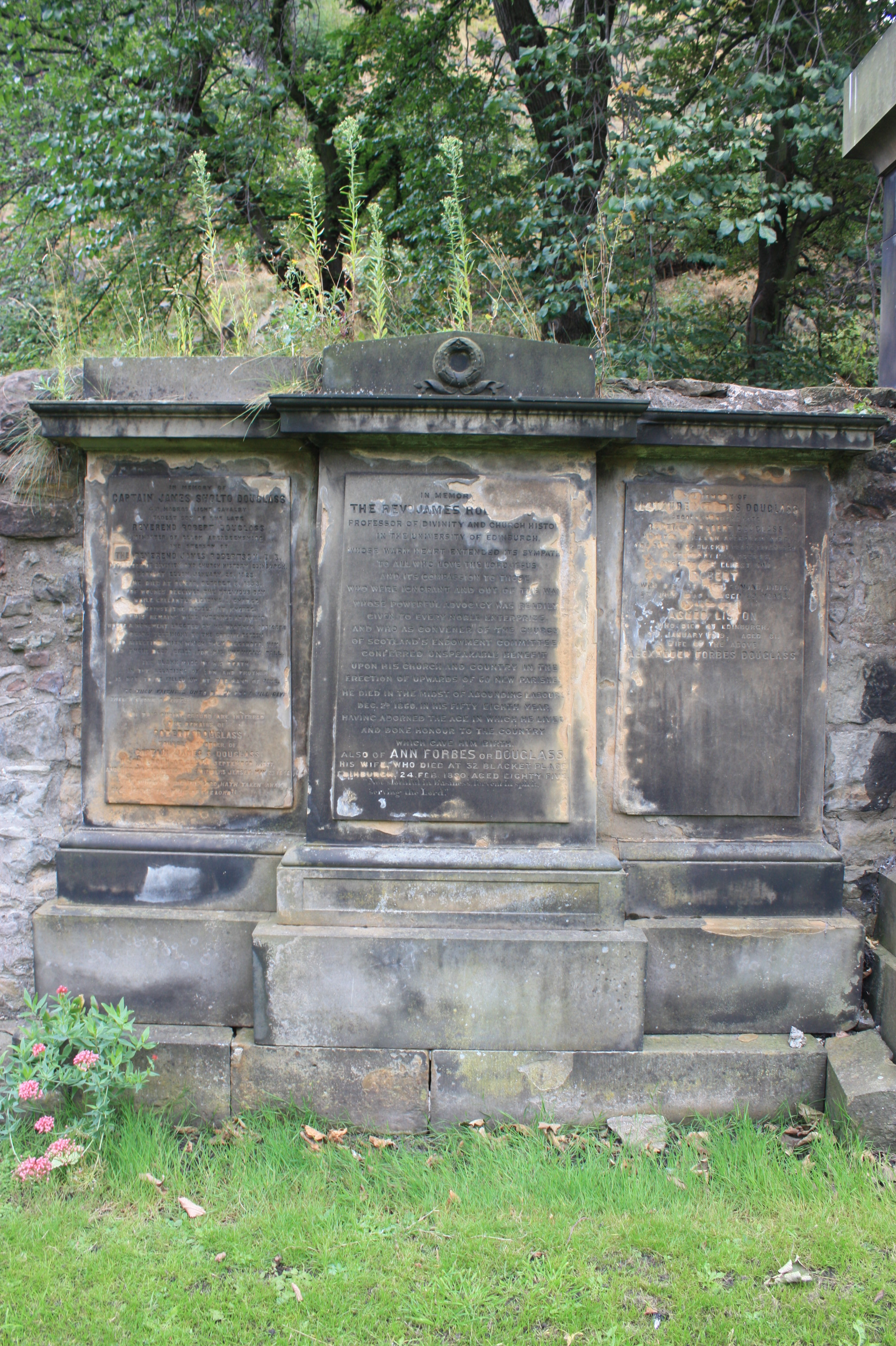
The grave of Very Rev Prof James Robertson, St Cuthbert's churchyard

He was born on 2 January 1803 at Ardlaw Farm near Old Pitsligo in Aberdeenshire, the son of Barbara Anderson and her husband, William Robertson, farmer. He was educated at Pitsligo and Tyrie parish schools. He then studied mathematics at the University of Aberdeen, graduating with an MA in 1820. In 1821 he began studying divinity and graduated a second time in 1825. Ordained to preach by the Church of Scotland he began preaching at Deer, Aberdeenshire in July 1825. He also ran a village school in Pitsligo.

In 1826 Robertson began tutoring the family of the Duke of Gordon at Gordon Castle. From this he was appointed as headmaster at Gordons Hospital in Aberdeen. The Duke also further organised for his being made minister of the parish of Ellon in 1832.

In 1841 Robertson was the first person in Britain to use bone meal as a fertilizer, this being done at Ellon (probably on the church glebe).

In 1843 Robertson was appointed to the Poor Law Commission and received an honorary doctorate (DD) from Aberdeen University and this enabled him to apply for a chair in Ecclesiastical History at the University of Edinburgh. During his professorship he was elected Moderator of the General Assembly for the period 1857–1858, being succeeded by Very Rev Matthew Leishman. In 1846 he was elected a fellow of the Royal Society of Edinburgh, his proposer being Alexander Brunton.

Robertson died at home, 25 Ainslie Place in Edinburgh's West End on 2 December 1860. He is buried in St Cuthbert's Churchyard off Princes Street.

His biography was written by Archibald Charteris.

== Family ==
In 1837 Robertson married Ann Douglass (née Forbes) (1805–1890), widow of Robert Douglass. He adopted her son, James Sholto Douglass (1823–1858).
