= Autoimmune skin diseases in dogs =

Autoimmune skin diseases occur when the immune system of an infected animal attacks its own skin. In dogs, autoimmune skin diseases are usually not detected until visible symptoms appear, which differs from detection in humans who are able to verbally express their concerns. Genetics, nutrition, and external environmental factors all collectively contribute to increasing the probability of an autoimmune skin disease occurring. The severity of symptoms varies based on the specific disease present and how far it has progressed. Diagnosis often requires the onset of visible symptoms and for a biopsy to be performed. For many diseases, the condition itself cannot be cured, but a veterinarian can prescribe medications and other forms of treatment to help manage the symptoms of the dog.

== Overview ==
The immune system has the ability to differentiate between the cells of the body and foreign cells. However, in dogs affected by an autoimmune disease, the immune system loses the ability to make this distinction, causing the immune system to attack the body. Autoimmune diseases in the base layer of the epidermis are characterized by damage to the connective tissue and vesicle formation located below the epidermis layer and the dermis layer below it. There are many autoimmune diseases, and they all vary in impact to the dog and progress at their own rates.

== Clinical symptoms ==
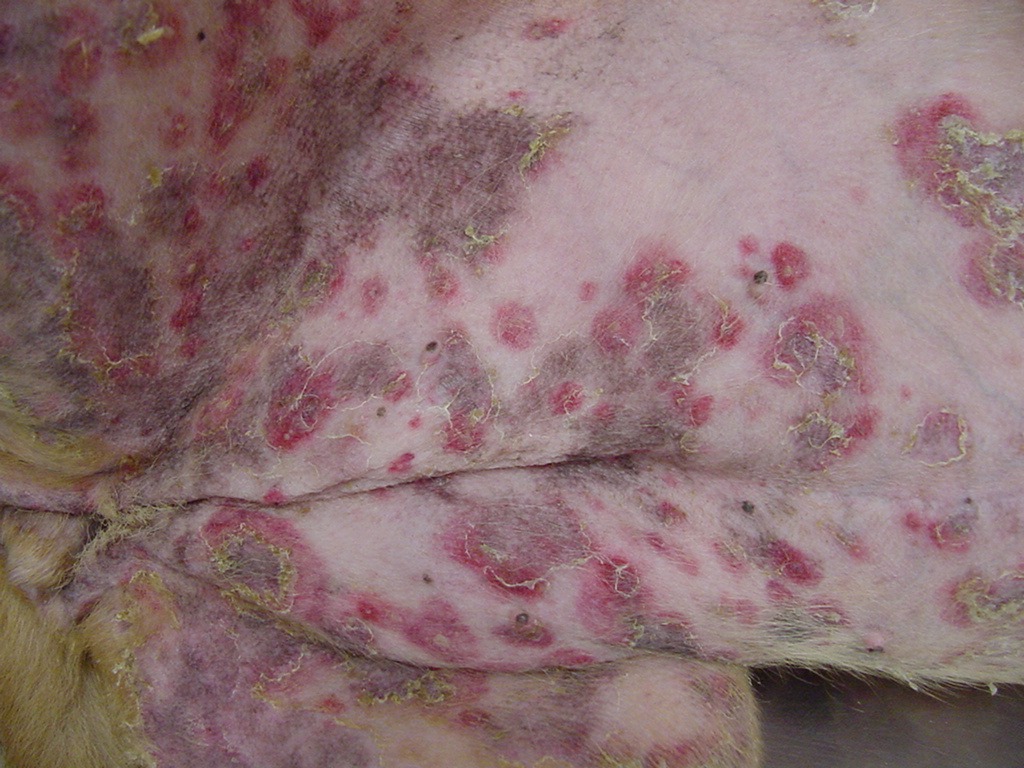
Pemphigus foliaceus in dogs: hair loss occurs, skin becomes red, and itchy.

Dogs suffering from autoimmune diseases of the skin may experience a variety of symptoms, including persistent itching and scratching, lesions, wounds, blisters, and other skin damage, as well as loss of skin pigment. Two cases of autoimmune diseases that are often found include Discoid lupus erythematosus (DLE) and Pemphigus. DLE can develop into Systemic Lupus Erythematosus (SLE). The initial stage of DLE is marked by a loss of skin pigment. The skin becomes red and sores appear on the nose. The palate can undergo erosion, ulceration, and injury to the nasal palate, as well as damage to the nostrils and the tissue around the eyes and ears. In chronic and severe cases, visual scar tissue often occurs.

Most symptoms occur after the outer epidermis and inner dermis of the skin are affected by the disease. When this happens, the layers of the skin begin to separate, leading to painful lesions and pustules. The compromised integrity of the skin barrier not only exacerbates the discomfort experienced by the dog, but also heightens the risk of secondary bacterial infections. The weakening of the skin's protective layers forms an environment susceptible to microbial infiltration, which can lead to severe complications. Intervening within an earlier timeframe and targeted management strategies are essential to minimize further adverse effects.

Another autoimmune skin disease which can occur in dogs is vitiligo. In addition to humans, vitiligo can be found in a variety of animals, including cats, horses, and dogs. Vitiligo is a type of autoimmune disease that damages melanocytes in the skin, lips, and oral cavity. Melanocytes are cells that contain pigments such as melanin. These pigments give rise to an organism's phenotype, which determines skin and hair color. Melanocytes are also found in other parts of the body, such as the oral mucosa, eye, cochlea, and the meninges. In addition to vitiligo, there are other autoimmune diseases that target melanocytes, such as Vogt-Koyanagi-Harada (VKH) syndrome, and Uveodermatological (UDS) syndrome. Vogt-Koyanagi-Harada syndrome is an autoimmune disease that affects the eyes. In addition to depigmentation of the skin, the disease is characterized by a combination of conditions, including uveitis, acute iridocyclitis, choroiditis, and retinal detachment.

When pemphigus occurs in humans, the skin will begin to blister due to antibodies attacking the adhesive proteins in epidermal cells, which causes them to separate. Different types of pemphigus can be identified based on the depth of separation present in the skin. Many forms of pemphigus can be identified in dogs using methods similar to those employed for humans.

Pemphigus vulgaris is rare in humans and animals, but is often fatal if left untreated. In dogs, the disease presents itself so similarly to the way it occurs in humans that dogs can be used as models for the disease in humans. When the disease first begins to manifest itself, lesions are usually evident in the oral cavity of the dog. Aside from these blisters, the dog may be mostly asymptomatic before the disease progresses further. The blisters are easily ruptured and become painful upon doing so, which can cause the dog to have difficulty eating. As the disease progresses, the infected dog can become severely infirm, and may succumb to further infection. Sometimes symptoms are characterized by lymphadenopathy, which involves loss of appetite, weakness, fever, and in rare cases, sepsis.

Pemphigus foliaceus is the most common autoimmune skin disease in dogs, making up around one-third of all canine autoimmune disorders. This disease usually affects areas of the ears and face. Early symptoms are characterized by depigmentation of the nasal palate, dorsal cleft in the mouth, the ear, and the periocular area around the eye. Itching, pain, and weakness of the body have been observed in some cases. Other symptoms of Pemphigus foliaceus include hair loss, formation of pustules, and erosions with ulcers. These symptoms can appear on the dog's feet, groin area, and trunk if left untreated.

== Disease incidence process ==
The immune system functions in many ways to eliminate foreign substances and particles introduced to the body. This revolves around T-cell differentiation, where mature T-cells with receptors for non-self cells target foreign antigens and act with other cells to dispose of them. There are two mechanisms of tolerance found in the immune system. The first mechanism is positive selection by the thymus, where only T-cells are selected. T-cells recognize peptides in the Histocompatibility Complex (MHC). The second mechanism is negative selection, where T-cells that recognize self-antigens with too high an affinity are removed through the process of apoptosis and are not allowed to enter the body's circulation.

Incidences of autoimmune skin diseases can vary based on several factors. Some of these factors include the breed, age, and sex of the dog, along with individual genetics and environmental factors.

In terms of vitiligo, certain breeds of dogs have a higher chance of developing the disease based on their genetics. These breeds include Rottweilers, German Shepherds, Old English Sheepdogs, Doberman Pinschers, Dachshunds, and German Shorthaired Pointers. However, the exact prevalence of this disease in dogs is currently unknown, as it is likely under-reported. Certain dog breeds that have been documented with Vogt-Koyanagi-Harada (VKH) syndrome include Akitas, Samoyeds, Irish Setters, Golden Retrievers, Saint Bernards, Australian Sheepdogs, and Shetland Sheepdogs.

Pemphigus vulgaris can occur in any breed of dog irrespective of its sex or age. However, it appears to occur more often in male dogs than females, which differs slightly from its occurrence in humans. In humans, women are more likely to be affected than men. In terms of age, the disease usually begins when the dog is at least five to seven years old. This correlates to the typical age in which it begins in humans as well, generally occurring in middle age.

== Diagnosis ==
Since many autoimmune skin diseases have similar symptoms and usually affect the oral cavity, a biopsy must often be performed in order to correctly diagnose the disease. Due to the wide scale of clinical symptoms that can be present, along with the diverse variations of skin autoimmune dermatoses, a single symptom will more than likely not lead to a diagnosis. Instead, the results of the biopsy combined with the canine's history and other clinical signs can help in confirming the diagnosis of the disease. Breed predisposition and the age of the dog can also be indications of the various possibilities of autoimmune skin diseases. Some common symptoms that can be used to lead to a confirmed diagnosis include alopecia, crusting, ulcerations, vasculitis, and many more.

Histopathology evaluations can be done by extracting areas of the skin that show indications of being affected, such as taking biopsies of lesions, pustules, and sites of crustation. These tissue samples would then be typically examined under a microscope, where a clinician will form a conclusive diagnosis based on the observed cellular structures and abnormalities. Additionally, other tests such as antinuclear antibody tests (ANA) and complete blood count with white blood cell differential tests can be used to gather more information.

For Pemphigus vulgaris, after the skin begins to separate, Nikolsky's sign can be useful to help diagnose the disease. This involves placing pressure along the edge of a blister and observing if the skin separates further and if the blister increases in size. However, to diagnose the disease with complete certainty, biopsies must be taken from the edge of the blisters. The tissue sample must then be analyzed using a direct immunofluorescence technique and analyzed microscopically. The direct immunofluorescence technique should be used instead of indirect, as the results may be inaccurate before the disease has progressed to a certain point.

== Treatment ==
For most autoimmune skin diseases, it is imperative to begin treatment as early as possible, as the progression of the disease can lead to severe complications and even death. Treatment for many diseases usually involves the use of immunosuppressants such as glucocorticoids. The immunosuppressants aid in suppressing the reaction of the immune system fighting against the body's healthy cells and tissues. This is done by the inhibition of calcineurin, an enzyme that controls and activates T-cell production. Without the consistent production of T-cells, a decrease of autoimmune activity can be observed, leading to less severe symptoms and potential remission of autoimmune diseases.

When treatment is first started for Pemphigus vulgaris, the dog will usually be given the corticosteroid prednisone for a limited time. This will be administered orally, and the amount given can vary between 1.5 and 13.3 milligrams for every kilogram of the dog's weight. This amount will continue until symptoms begin to subside. Afterward the dose will be lowered, and other medications will be used. The condition cannot be cured, so the dog will require immunosuppressants and steroids for the duration of its lifespan. The specific immunosuppressants used generally include cyclophosphamide, methotrexate, or azathioprine. Antibiotics may also be used to help reduce the risk of infection.

== See also ==
- Dog skin disorders
