= Bone crusher =

Water mill for bone reduction

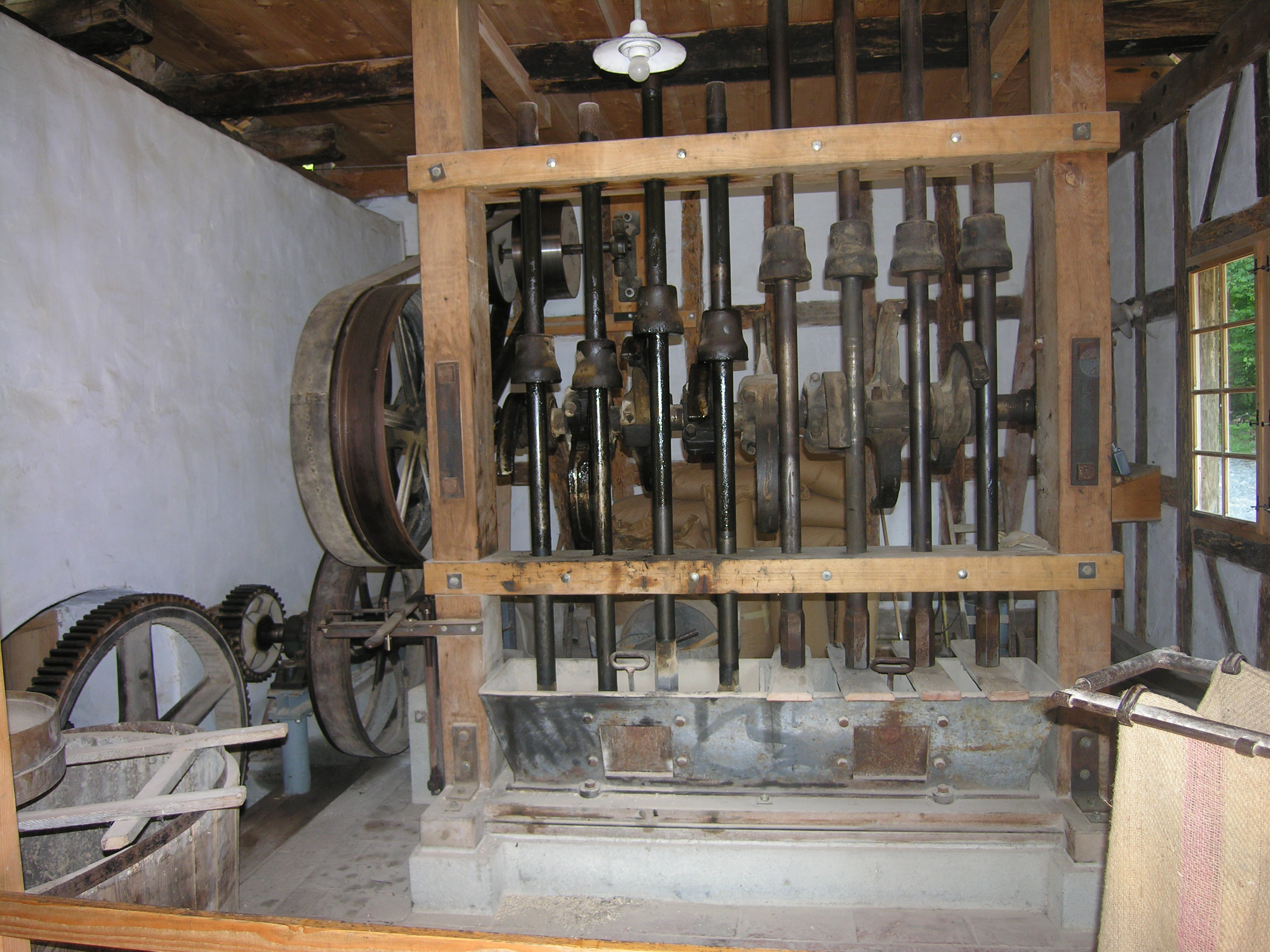
Water wheel-powered bone crusher

A bone crusher, also known as a bone mill, is a device regularly used for crushing animal bones. Bones obtained during slaughter are cleaned, boiled in water and dried for several months. After that, they are suitable for crushing with the special machine into a relatively dry gritty powder which is used as fertilizer. The machine, shown in the picture, is powered by a water wheel. It contains eight S-shaped pairs of cams that raise the crushers alternately and let them fall into material to be crushed. The simple transmission increases the rotation speed of the crusher wheel to 21 rpm from the water wheel speed of about 7 rpm.

Bone meal has been used since about 1790 as a fertilizer supplement to ordinary farmyard manure. From about 1880 onwards it was supplanted by chemical fertilizers.

The bone meal produced by bone mills could also be used to make bone china.

== See also ==
- Stamp mill, a similar machine used to crush ore in mining situations.
