= Bone meal =

Nutritional supplement and fertilizer made from ground-up bones and entrails

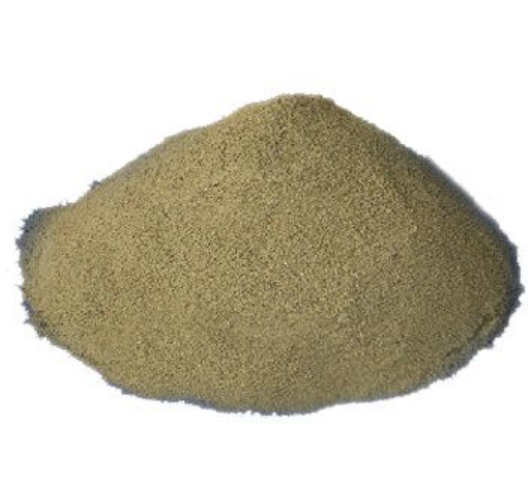
Bone meal

Bone meal (or bonemeal) is a mixture of finely and coarsely ground animal bones and slaughter-house waste products. It is used as a dietary supplement to supply calcium and phosphorus to monogastric livestock in the form of hydroxyapatite, or as a slow-release organic fertilizer to supply phosphorus, calcium, and a small amount of nitrogen to plants.

== Uses ==
=== Dietary supplement ===
Bone meal, along with a variety of other meals, especially meat meal, is used as a dietary/mineral supplement for livestock. The improper application of bone and meat meal products in animal nutrition can contribute to the spread of transmissible spongiform encephalopathy, commonly known in cattle as Mad Cow Disease. Proper heat control can reduce salmonella contaminants.

Bone meal was historically used as a human dietary calcium supplement. Research has shown that calcium and lead in their ionic forms (Ca^{2+}, Pb^{2+}) have similar atomic structures and so create a potential for accumulation of lead in bones. American actress Allison Hayes was poisoned in the 1970s with a calcium supplement made from horse bone containing high amounts of lead, which moved the EPA to develop more stringent importation rules.

=== Fertilizer ===
Bone meal provides phosphorus and calcium to plants, along with a largely inconsequential amount of nitrogen. The N-P-K rating of bone meal is typically 3–15–0 along with a calcium content of around 12% (18% CaO equiv.), although it can vary quite a bit depending on the source from 1–13–0 to 3–22–0.

As bone meal is water-insoluble, it needs to be broken down before the plant can absorb it, either by soil acidity or by microbial activity producing acids. According to the Colorado State University, it can only be broken down in acidic soil (pH < 7.0) and releases its nutrients over a span of 1 to 4 months.

== History ==
The process was first suggested by Justus von Liebig (dissolving animal bones in sulphuric acid) around 1840 and first used in Britain by James Robertson in Ellon, Aberdeenshire in 1841.

Before Liebig, the expansion of agriculture had depleted the soil of essential nutrients. In desperation, farmers collected the bones from major battlefields like the Battle of Waterloo and the Battle of Austerlitz to crush them and refertilize the soil.

In 19th-century Europe, large-scale production and international trade in bone meal was seen as essential for agricultural development.

== See also ==
- Blood meal
- Bone crusher
- Feather meal
- Meat and bone meal
- Organic hydroponic solutions
