= Allergies in cats =

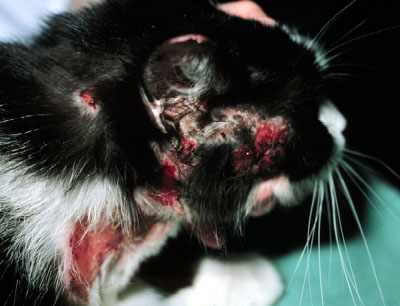
A cat showing extreme signs of pruritus.

Cats exposed to allergens may develop allergies or allergic reactions. Allergies tend to become evident and intensify over extended periods of time and can take years to develop. Some allergic diseases and allergies in cats include feline atopic dermatitis, flea allergy dermatitis, feline-mosquito hypersensitivity, and food-induced allergy. In the case of feline atopy, hypersensitivity to allergens is due to genetic predisposition. However, various allergies may arise due to environmental factors. Allergens, ingested, inhaled, or airborne, can be seasonal or non-seasonal, similar to allergies in humans. Suspected seasonal allergens include but are not limited to pollen, fleas, and mosquito bites; suspected non-seasonal allergens include but are not limited to plastic materials, food, dust, trees, and grass. After exposure to suspected allergens, symptoms may be immediate or delayed, arising within a few minutes to two hours. Symptoms can include both dermatological and gastrointestinal signs such as itchy skin, hair loss and excessive scratching. In cases of feline atopic dermatitis or atopy in cats, pruritic skin diseases may result; however, signs can also include miliary dermatitis, symmetrical alopecia, and lesions of the eosinophilic granuloma complex.

Food allergies account for approximately 10% of allergies in both dogs and cats. Food allergies are often mistaken for food intolerances, which can result in vomiting and diarrhea instead of dermal issues. In most cases where food allergies occur, they do so with foods that cats eat most often. Common food allergens in cats include beef, dairy, fish, eggs, and chicken. Preservatives and other additives are also occasionally involved in triggering an allergic reaction. There is no specific breed or age range that food allergies target; however, there are certain breeds that are more susceptible to food allergies than others. For example, Siamese and Siamese crosses may have a higher risk of food allergies than other breeds.

== Hypoallergenic elimination diets for cats ==
=== Limited ingredient diets ===
A limited-ingredient diet, also known as limited-antigen food, is an elimination diet that restricts the problematic foods that cause a reaction. Usually these diets focus on removing specific proteins (protein-elimination diets) due to dietary allergies usually being caused by water-soluble glycoproteins, but they can also be targeted towards the removal of gluten/wheat, vegetables, or a combination of both. In commercially available versions of these diets, producers usually include one protein and one carbohydrate source, in an effort to minimize reactions to any foods.

=== Homemade diets ===
Homemade diets are a type of elimination diet, which are made specifically for the cat with allergies, either by the owner or a third-party person like a chef. Studies suggest that commercial elimination diets may still react negatively with a cat, even if they are devoid of the target protein/other problematic foods. Many pet owners, for this reason, choose the homemade option, as it allows them to personally identify the pet's history, tailor the diet with various ingredients, and consider the process a bonding experience. Some drawbacks to a homemade diet are the time needed to shop for the ingredients and the potential financial setback.

Also, homemade diets are generally nutritionally deficient. For example, a study found that 90% of homemade elimination diets are not adequate in terms of nutrition. However, homemade diets are a great way to determine which ingredient is causing the negative symptoms in the cat.

=== Hydrolyzed proteins ===
Hydrolyzed proteins are often used as the primary source of protein in a diet, particularly in elimination diets, since these proteins do not cause allergenic responses. This is because the digestive tract breaks down the protein into a size that the body is unable to recognize as the offending protein, allowing the protein source to bypass the allergenic immune response associated with IgE. This avoidance of the immune reaction allows the animal to eat a sufficient protein source without the immune system interfering.

A partially-hydrolyzed protein, i.e. too small to cause an IgE-mediated allergy but still large enough to be antigenic, may speed up the development of immune tolerance to the original protein.

=== Novel proteins ===
A novel protein is a protein source used in hypoallergenic diets to which the cat has not previously been exposed. Common examples of novel proteins are lamb, rabbit, venison, duck, elk, kangaroo, ostrich, emu, goose and goat. However, there is a chance of cross-reactivity when there is a higher taxonomic relationship between the two species. For example, cross-reactivity could be caused by other ruminant meats if the cat reacted negatively to beef, or avian meats if the cat reacted negatively to chicken.

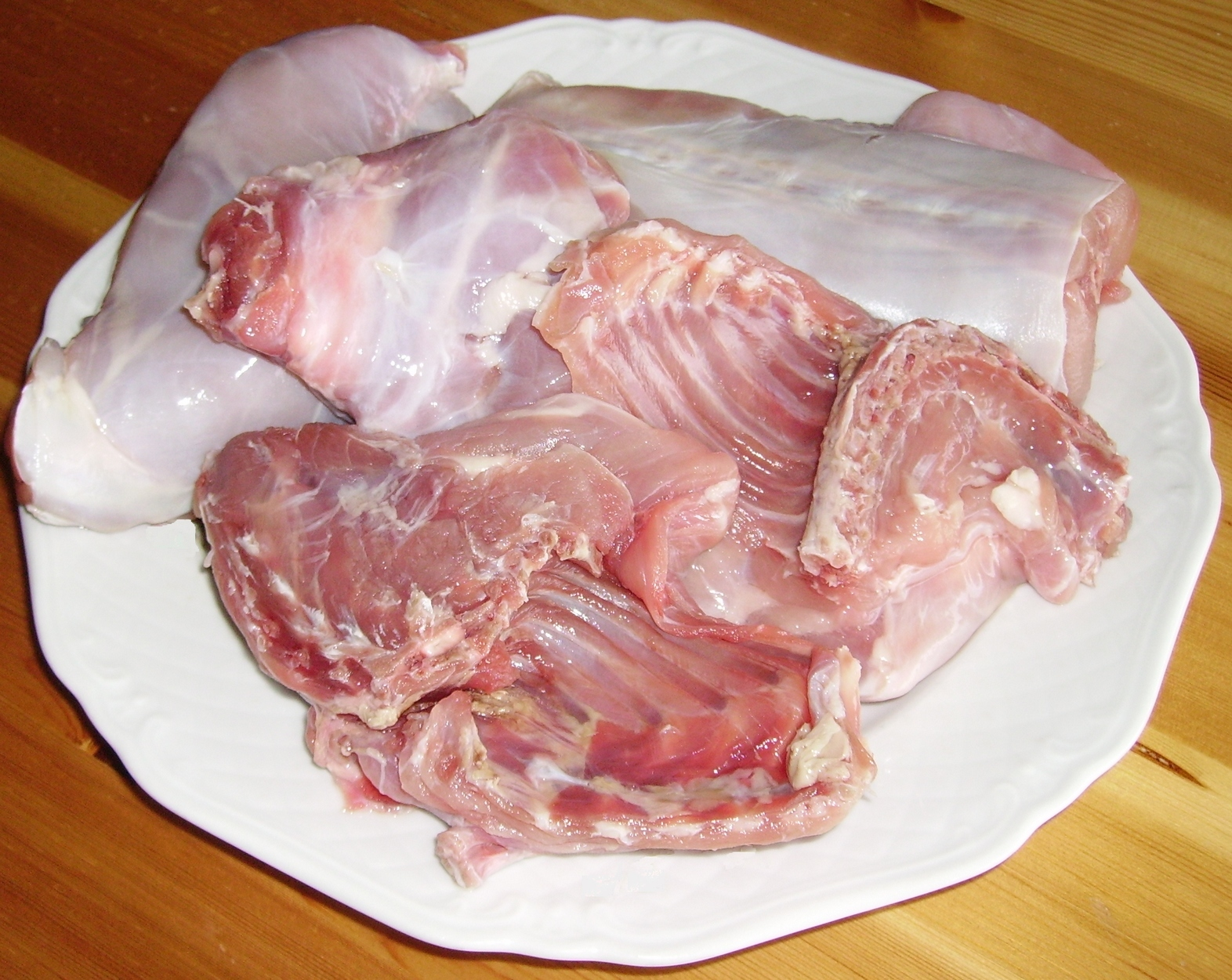
Rabbit meat

Novel proteins can be used in elimination diets as well for long-term management. Many commercialized novel protein diets are nutritionally adequate and balanced. They have only one protein source and one carbohydrate source that the cats are unlikely to have ingested before. Owners are more likely to be compliant when feeding a commercial novel protein diet than when feeding a home cooked diet. This is due to the fact that it can be difficult to obtain novel proteins for food preparation, and it takes less time to provide a commercial diet than to prepare a home cooked one.

In the early '90s, an experiment was performed showing that novel protein diets had a 70 to 80% success rate. However, commercialized novel protein diets are not always effective, since they are not always tested on animals that have food sensitivities, and the manufacturing process of the diets can cause adverse reactions due to the inclusion of additives which may be allergens to some cats. A study showed that if the processing machinery was not cleaned properly, ground meat that came from one animal could be contaminated with the ground meat from another animal. This study found that four commercial diets using venison included products that were not on the label. Soy, beef and poultry were found in three of the diets, which are common antigens in cats. However, if the commercial novel protein diet does not cause an adverse reaction in the cat, it can be used long term.

== See also ==
- Cat health
- Allergies
- Cat food
- Allergies in dogs
