= Alabama rot =

Often fatal condition in dogs

Alabama rot, Greenetrack disease, or cutaneous and renal glomerular vasculopathy (CRGV) is an often fatal condition in dogs. It was first identified in the US in the 1980s in greyhounds. The high number of affected dogs at the Greenetrack Racing Park, Alabama, led to the initial pseudonyms of Greenetrack Disease and Alabama Rot. The initial symptoms are skin lesions on the legs, chest and abdomen followed by renal involvement.

In November 2012 the first cases were suspected in the UK. In January 2014, the outbreak in England was identified as having the same or similar histological and clinical findings as Alabama rot, though this could not be classified as Alabama Rot as the histological results from the UK lacked the relation to E. coli that was present in all the cases in the US, although a wide range of breeds were affected. The suspected disease has been possibly identified across England and Wales, with a case being reported as far north as North Yorkshire in March 2015. A map posted online shows confirmed (with post-mortem) and unconfirmed (without post-mortem) cases of CRGV since December 2012 in the United Kingdom. In May 2017 it was reported that 98 suspected deaths from the disease have occurred in the UK, including 15 in 2017.

== Signs and symptoms ==
The disease is characterized by cutaneous and sometimes renal changes with the latter frequently being ultimately fatal.

Common symptoms of CRGV include, but are not limited to:

- Cutaneous lesions involving erythema, erosion, ulceration occurring mainly on extremities such as distal limbs, muzzle and ventrum
- Pyrexia (fever)
- Lethargy or malaise
- Anorexia
- Vomiting or retching

== Causes ==
Some veterinary experts theorize the disease is caused by a parasite, while others believe it is bacterial. It is more widely believed that Alabama rot is caused by toxins produced by E. coli but, as there has been no presence of E. coli in histological examination in UK cases, the disease is described there as suspected CRGV rather than Alabama rot per se. Because the exact cause has not been found, developing a vaccine is not possible. The cause of Alabama rot in the UK is under study as of 2013 at Anderson Moores Veterinary Specialists in Winchester, Hampshire. A podcast on Alabama rot was published in April 2014 by the Royal Veterinary College. As of February 2015 the Forestry Commission England will only publish specific site location details if "cases are confirmed as CRGV and a scientific connection to the dogs walked on the site is made".

A comprehensive report on CRGV was published in March 2015 by the British Veterinary Association, concluding that it is a disease of unknown cause "carrying a poor prognosis when azotaemia develops". However, an association has been linked to dogs walking on muddy ground.

== Treatments ==
Treatment is primarily symptomatic involving wound management of skin lesions and aggressive supportive therapy when renal compromise occurs. Some UK dogs with Alabama rot have been successfully treated since 2013. A webinar on Alabama rot by the Royal Veterinary College on 11 February 2015 was tutored by David Walker of Anderson Moores Veterinary Specialists. As the disease is widely believed to spread via dogs' feet and legs, due to the current lack of treatment the best action is to avoid infection by not walking dogs in a suspected infected area.

In August 2018 sources reported that plasmapheresis (therapeutic plasma exchange) resulted in survival of 2 out of 6 dogs with advanced disease. This finding offers hope that such blood filtering could result in better survival rates, particularly if caught early before vascular and renal damage occur.

== Epidemiology ==
The number of cases in the US is not known, but it was confined to greyhounds and in many cases was not fatal; however, as of 2017 there had been 103 suspected cases in the UK.

Analysis by Felcana found that between 2018 and 2020, South West and South East regions had the highest proportion of Alabama Rot cases per 100,000 dogs in the UK.
