= Organic fertilizer =

Fertilizer developed from natural processes

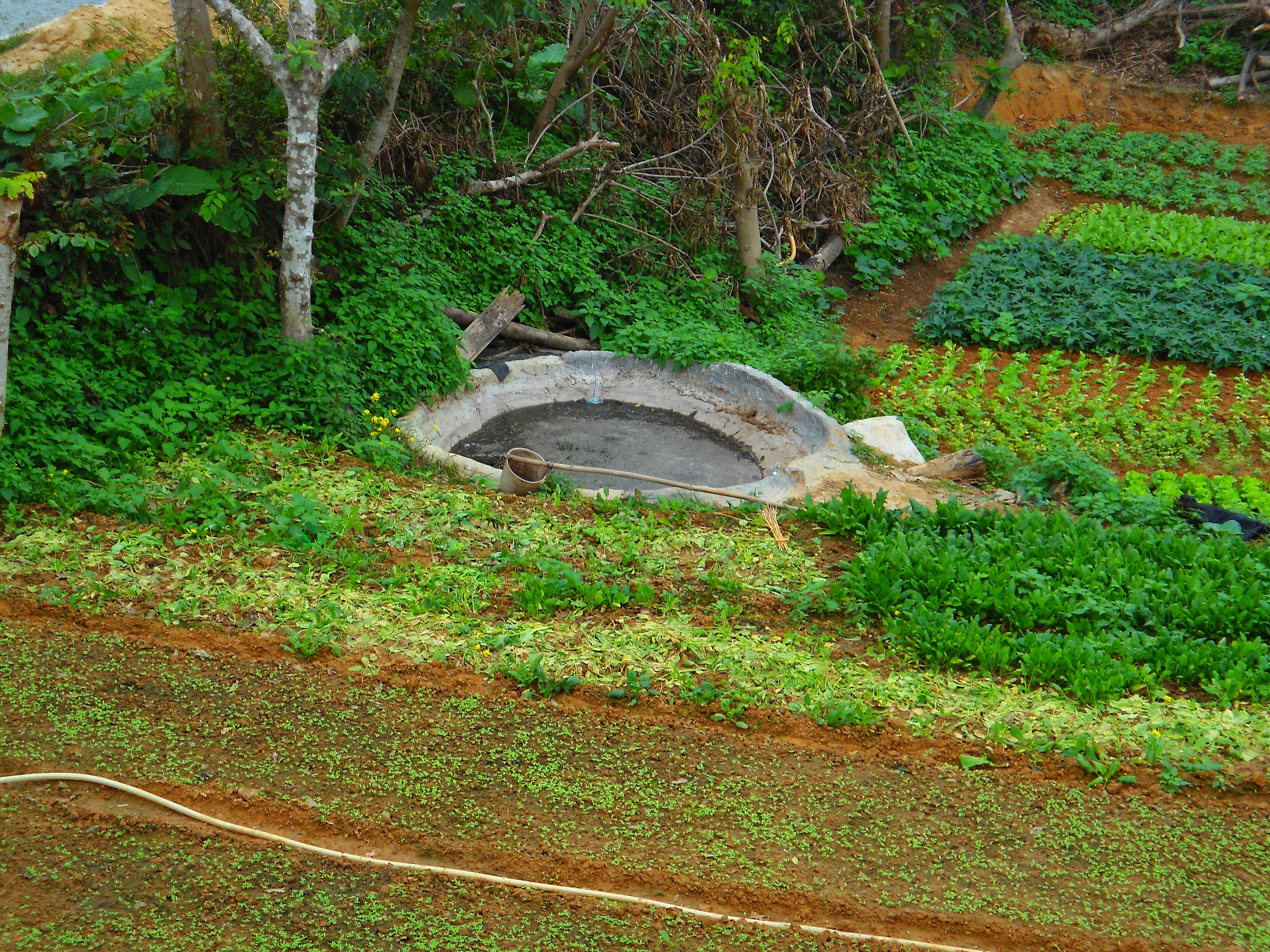
A cement reservoir containing cow manure mixed with water. This is common in rural Hainan Province, China. Note the bucket on a stick that the farmer uses to apply the mixture.

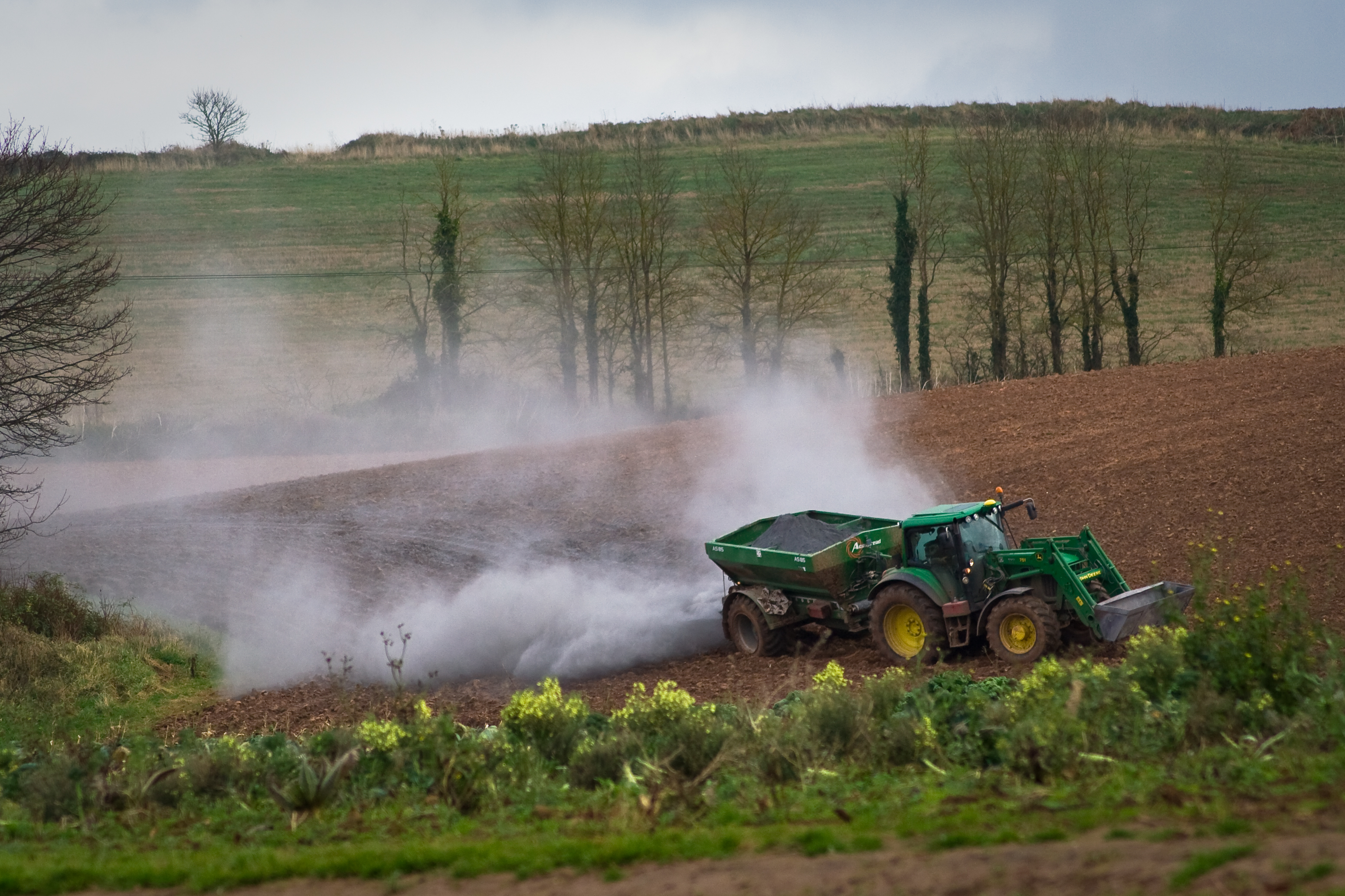
Liming soil

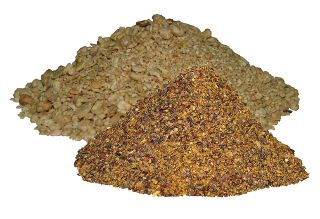
Bone meal and meat meal can be added to soil to stimulate root growth and to release phosphorus.

Organic fertilizers are fertilizers that are naturally produced. Fertilizers are materials that can be added to soil or plants, in order to provide nutrients and sustain growth. Typical organic fertilizers include all animal waste including meat processing waste, manure, slurry, and guano; plus plant based fertilizers such as compost; and biosolids. Inorganic "organic fertilizers" include minerals and ash. Organic refers to the Principles of Organic Agriculture, which determines whether a fertilizer can be used for commercial organic agriculture, not whether the fertilizer consists of organic compounds. Different countries have different criteria on how organic certifications are awarded.

== Examples and sources ==
The main organic fertilizers are, peat, animal wastes, plant wastes from agriculture, and treated sewage sludge.

=== Minerals ===
Minerals can be mined from fossil products of animal activity, such as greensand (anaerobic marine deposits), some limestones (fossil shell deposits), and some rock phosphates (fossil guano). Adding limestone or “liming” a soil is a way to raise pH. By raising the pH of a soil, microbial growth can be stimulated, which in turn increases biological processes, enabling nutrients to flow more freely through the soil. When nutrients flow freely they are more accessible to plants and therefore can increase plant health and mass. If the soil is already pH balanced, liming the soil, would be ineffective.

- Rock phosphate
- Raw Langbeinite
- Rockdust
- Unprocessed natural potassium sulfate

=== Animal sources ===
Animal sourced materials include both animal manures and residues from the slaughter of animals.

Manures are derived from milk-producing dairy animals, egg-producing poultry, and animals raised for meat and hide production, or sport and recreation. Manure is an abundant resource with estimations for cattle manure in the US alone reaching two billion tons annually, and one hen has the potential to produce a cubic foot of manure every six months. By adding manure to crops it adds nitrogen, potassium, phosphorus, sulfur, magnesium and calcium. While also increasing soil stability by increasing organic material, increasing water infiltration, it can add bacteria diversity and over time reduce the impacts of soil erosion.

However, there is organic manure and non-organic manure. In order for manure to be considered organic it must come from organic livestock or certified organic growers. If organic manure is not available, they are permitted to use non-organic manure as long as the animals have room to roam, are not kept in the dark, and growers abstain from using genetically modified feeds.

Fresh manure, right from the stall, can cause issues because it can be too high in ammonia, or contain bacteria from the animal's gut. This can have an adverse effect on plants as the ammonia can burn the roots and microbes from the animal's gut can harm the microorganisms in the soil, killing them, or contaminate produce, such as E. coli and salmonella. There is also a risk of introducing weeds, as seeds can pass through the gut of an animal relatively unharmed, or there can be seeds in the bedding of the livestock, which is often mixed in with the manure. Therefore, manure is required to be composted which will ideally kill any seeds or pathogens and reduce the ammonia content.

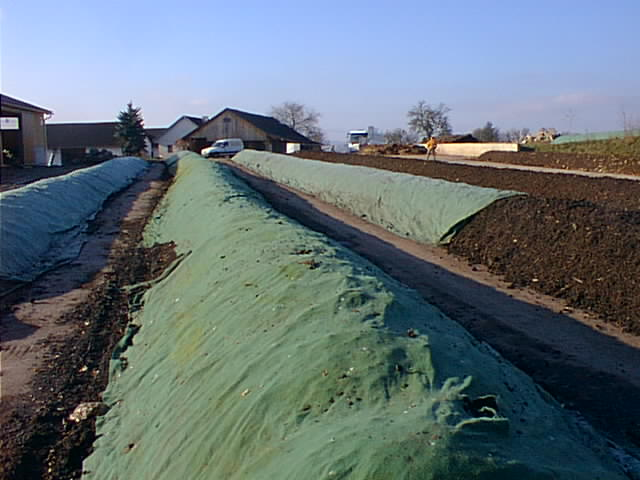
A large commercial compost operation

Chicken litter, which consists of chicken manure and bedding, is an organic fertilizer that has been proposed to be superior for conditioning soil for harvest to synthetic fertilizers. It contains similar minerals to other manures, while also having trace amounts of copper, zinc, magnesium, boron, and chloride. Depending on the type of chicken litter obtained, it may contain bird remains. This type of chicken litter should not be spread on crops, and can pose a risk to grazing livestock due to botulism, a disease caused by bacteria within decaying birds.

Horse manure contains the perfect balance of Carbon to Nitrogen for composting (30:1) and is a traditional garden soil amendment. However, careful organic sourcing is critical because feed (and bedding materials) from fields treated with the picolinic acid family of herbicides including aminopyralid, clopyralid, and picloram (marketed in the US as Milestone and Grazon-) can pass through a horse's digestive tract, remaining unchanged in manure and compost piles for long periods. These chemicals commonly affect potatoes, tomatoes, and beans, causing deformed plants and poor or non-existent yields. Also, horse de-wormers like Ivermectin can be detected in manure at levels harmful to beneficial insects and organisms for up to 45 days. Tainted compost can not only kill plants and beneficial organisms, but can create liability issues for owners.

Bat guano has been used as a fertilizer for thousands of years, most prominently by the Incans, who valued bats and their guano so much, the penalty for killing a bat was death. Bat guano is high in elements such as carbon, nitrogen, sulfur, and phosphorus. Guano typically contains about 10% nitrogen, which helps plants keep a healthy and vibrant green color and promotes rapid growth. Guano compared to manufactured fertilizers is safe to use inside and outside of the house, large gardens or small plants, and does not leach from the soil but rather remains and continues to slowly feed the plants and enhance the soil. Guano is also rich in bio-remediation microbes which helps to clean unnatural toxins from the soil that can prevent plant growth and cause rapid decay.

Urine, from humans as well as animals, is a fertilizer: urea in urine is a nitrogen compound, and urine also contains phosphorus and potassium. Human urine typically has about 3 times as much nitrogen as potassium, and more than 20 times as much nitrogen as phosphorus. The amount of potassium in urine is variable, and depends on the amount of potassium in the person's diet. While animal urine, as from cattle and pigs, is widely used on farmer's fields, human urine other than as part of sewage sludge is not currently allowed to be used in any commercial agricultural operations. However, there are ongoing studies that have shown that aging urine in closed containers for 12–16 months eliminates 99% of harmful bacteria, due to increasing urea content and therefore pH.

Animal by-products. When any animal is butchered, only about 40% to 60% of the live animal is converted to market product, with the remaining 40% to 60% classed as by-products. These by-products of animal slaughter, mostly inedible—blood, bone, feathers, hides, hoofs, horns, -- can be refined into agricultural fertilizers including blood meal, bone meal fish meal, and feather meal.

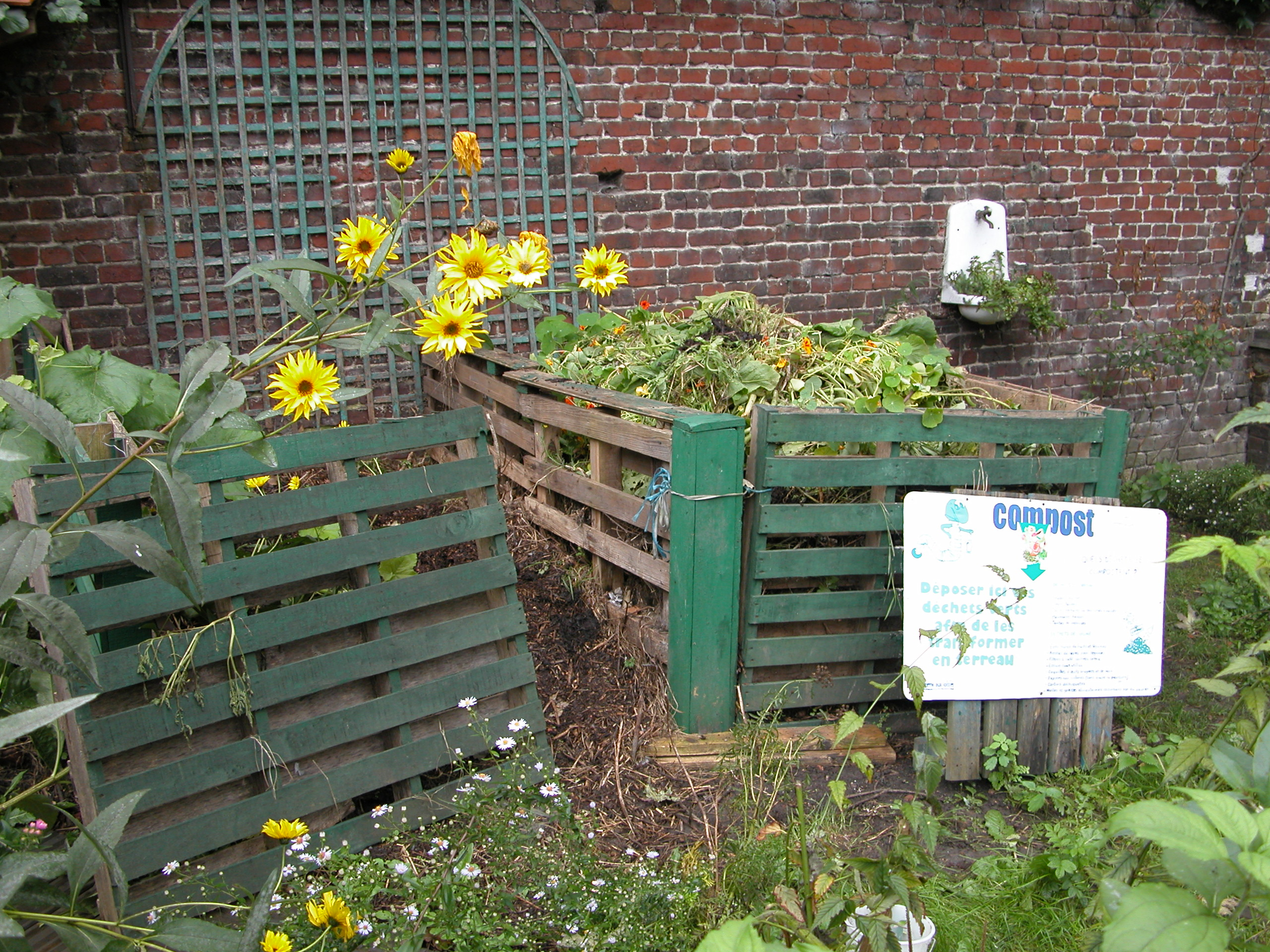
Compost bin for small-scale production of organic fertilizer

- Blood meal
- Bone meal
- Fish emulsion
- Fish meal
- Manure
- Wood chips/sawdust
- PROM

=== Plant ===
Processed organic fertilizers include compost, liquid plant manures, humic acid, grain meal, amino acids, and seaweed extracts. Other examples are natural enzyme-digested proteins. Decomposing crop residue (green manure) from prior years is another source of fertility.

Compost provides little in the means of nutrients to plants, but it does provide soil stability through increasing organic matter. Compost does help microorganisms proliferate which in turn breaks down decaying plant material into substantial bio-available nutrients for plant to easily assimilate. Compost does not need to be fully plant-based: it is often made with a mix of carbon-rich plant waste and nitrogen-rich animal waste including human excreta as a means to remove pathogens and odor from the latter.

Grain meals can be made of corn gluten, alfalfa, cottonseed, or soybean. Most supply nitrogen and potassium, but soybean meal provides nitrogen and phosphorus. When initially spread they can cause an increase in ammonia within the soil and burn seeds, it is recommended to use these after plants have developed, to ensure crop success.

Other ARS studies have found that algae used to capture nitrogen and phosphorus runoff from agricultural fields can not only prevent water contamination of these nutrients, but also can be used as an organic fertilizer. ARS scientists originally developed the "algal turf scrubber" to reduce nutrient runoff and increase quality of water flowing into streams, rivers, and lakes. They found that this nutrient-rich algae, once dried, can be applied to cucumber and corn seedlings and result in growth comparable to that seen using synthetic fertilizers.

Ash produced by plant combustion is also an important K fertilizer.

==== Peat ====
Peat, or turf, is plant material that is only partially decomposed. It is a source of organic matter. Soil with higher levels of organic matter are less likely to compact, which improves the soil aeration and water drainage, as well as assists in supporting soil microbial health. It is sometimes credited as being the most widely use organic fertilizer and by volume is the top organic amendment.

=== Human waste ===
Sewage sludge, also known as biosolids, is effluent that has been treated, blended, composted, and sometimes dried until deemed biologically safe. As a fertilizer it is most commonly used on non-agricultural crops such as in silviculture or in soil remediation. Use of bio-solids in agricultural production is less common, and the National Organic Program of the USDA (NOP) has ruled that biosolids are not permitted in organic food production in the U.S.; while biologic in origin (vs mineral), sludge is unacceptable due to toxic metal accumulation, pharmaceuticals, hormones, and other factors.

With concerns about human borne pathogens coupled with a growing preference for flush toilets and centralized sewage treatment, biosolids have been replacing night soil (from human excreta), a traditional organic fertilizer that is minimally processed.

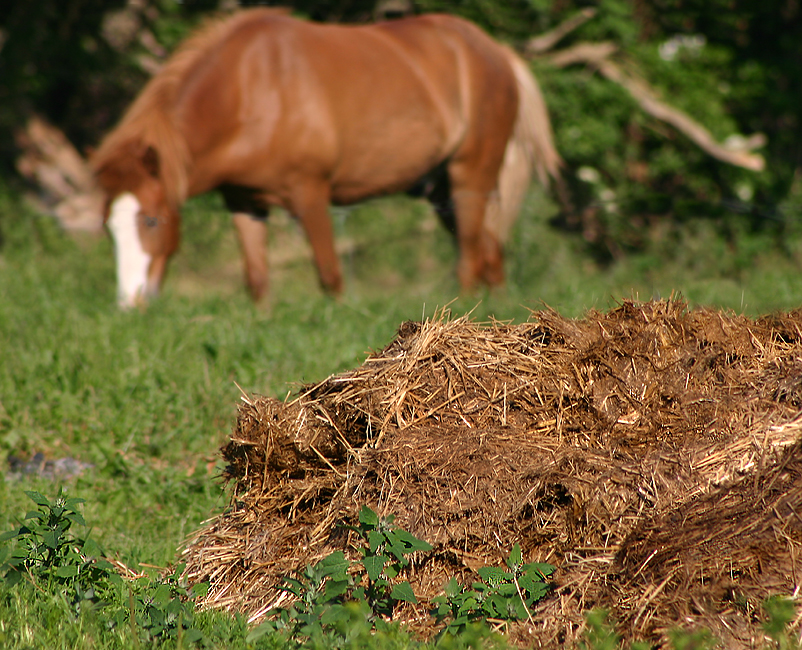
Decomposing animal manure is an organic fertilizer source

== Farming application ==
In non-organic farming, a compromise between the use of artificial and organic fertilizers is common, often using inorganic fertilizers supplemented with the application of organics that are readily available such as the return of crop residues or the application of manure.

Cover crops are also grown to enrich soil as a green manure through nitrogen fixation from the atmosphere; as well as phosphorus (through nutrient mobilization) content of soils.

Fertilizer trees aid organic farming by bringing nutrients from the depths of the soil, and by assisting in the regulation of water usage.

Leguminous cover crops or fertilizer trees are also grown to enrich soil as a green manure through nitrogen fixation from the atmosphere; as well as phosphorus (through nutrient mobilization) content of soils.

== Comparison ==
=== Bulk density ===
In general, the nutrients in organic fertilizers are both more diluted and also much less readily available to plants. This may be however desired as a form of slow-release fertilizer containing insoluble nitrogen. By their nature, organic fertilizers increase physical and biological nutrient storage mechanisms in soils, mitigating risks of over-fertilization. Organic fertilizer nutrient content, solubility, and nutrient release rates are typically much lower than mineral (inorganic) fertilizers. A University of North Carolina study found that potential mineralizable nitrogen (PMN) in the soil was 182–285% higher in organic mulched systems than in the synthetics control.

There do exist 'fast-release' organic fertilizers with a risk of fertilizer burn. These include uncomposted animal manures, fish emulsion, blood meal, and urine. Composting converts nitrogen in these sources into more stable forms (with some loss).

=== Soil biology ===
Organic fertilizers have been known to improve biodiversity (soil life) and long-term productivity of soil, and may prove a large depository for excess carbon dioxide.

Organic nutrients increase the abundance of soil organisms by providing organic matter and micronutrients for organismal relationships such as fungal mycorrhiza, (which aid plants in absorbing nutrients), and can drastically reduce external inputs of pesticides, energy and fertilizer, at the cost of decreased yield.

=== Consistency ===
Organic fertilizers from composts and other sources can be quite variable from one batch to the next. Without batch testing, amounts of applied nutrient cannot be precisely known. Nevertheless, one or more studies have shown they are at least as effective as chemical fertilizers over longer periods of use.

== See also ==
- Biosecurity
- Compost
- Controlled release fertiliser
- Cover crop
- Fertilizer
- Food additive
- Grasscycling
- Manure
- Vermicompost

== See also ==
- Seaweed fertilizer
- Biofertilizer
- Organic hydroponic solutions
- Reuse of excreta
