= Cat skin disorders =

Health problem in cats

Cat skin disorders are among the most common health problems in cats. Skin disorders in cats have many causes, and many of the common skin disorders that afflict people have a counterpart in cats. The condition of a cat's skin and coat can also be an important indicator of its general health. Skin disorders of cats vary from acute, self-limiting problems to chronic or long-lasting problems requiring life-time treatment. Cat skin disorders may be grouped into categories according to the causes.

== Types of disorders ==
=== Immune-mediated skin disorders ===
Skin disease may result from deficiencies in immune system function. In cats, the most common cause of immune deficiency is infection with retroviruses, FIV or FeLV, and cats with these chronic infections are subject to repeated bouts of skin infection and abscesses. This category also includes hypersensitivity disorders and eosinophilic skin diseases such as atopic dermatitis, miliary dermatitis and feline eosinophilic granuloma and skin diseases caused by autoimmunity, such as pemphigus and discoid lupus.

=== Infectious skin diseases ===
An important infectious skin disease of cats is ringworm, or dermatophytosis. Other cat skin infections include parasitic diseases like mange and lice infestations.

Other ectoparasites, including fleas and ticks, are not considered directly contagious but are acquired from an environment where other infested hosts have established the parasite's life cycle.

Another common skin infection is cat bite abscess. A mixture of bacteria introduced by a bite wound cause infections in pockets under the skin and affected cats often show manic depression and fever.

=== Hereditary and developmental skin diseases ===
Some diseases are inherent abnormalities of skin structure or function. These include skin fragility syndrome (Ehlers-Danlos), hereditary hypotrichosis and congenital or hereditary alopecia.

== Nutrition related disorders ==
Nutritional related disorders can arise if the cat's food intake decreases, interactions between ingredients or nutrients occur, or mistakes are made during food formulation or manufacturing. Degradation of some nutrients can occur during storage. Nutritional related skin disorders can result in excesses or deficiencies in the production of sebum and in keratinization, the toughening of the outer layer of the skin. This can result in dandruff, erythema, hair loss, greasy skin, and diminished hair growth.

=== Minerals ===
Zinc is important for the skin's function, as it is involved in the production of DNA and RNA, and therefore important for cells that divide rapidly. A deficiency in zinc mainly results in skin disorders in adult cats, but also results in growth oddities. The skin of a cat deficient in zinc would likely have erythema and hair loss. The cat may have crusty, scaly skin on its limbs or tail. The coat of the cat becomes dull. Similarly, copper can affect coat health of cats; deficiencies will cause fading of coat color and weakened skin, leading to lesions.

=== Protein ===
The hair of a cat is made of mainly protein, and cats need about 25-30% protein in their diets, much higher than what a dog needs. A deficiency in protein usually happens when kittens are fed dog food or when low-protein diets are fed improperly. If a cat has a protein deficiency, the cat will lose weight. The coat condition will be poor, with dull, thinning, weak, and patchy hair. To remedy this, a diet with adequate amounts of protein must be fed.

=== Essential fatty acids ===
Cats must have both linoleic acid and arachidonic acid in their diet, due to their low production of the δ-6 desaturase enzyme. A deficiency in these fatty acids can occur if the fats in the cat's food are oxidized and become rancid from improper storage. A cat will be deficient for many months prior to seeing clinical signs in the skin, after which the skin will become scaly and greasy, while the coat will become dull. To treat health concerns caused by a deficiency of fatty acids, the ratio of n-3 to n-6 fatty acids must be corrected and supplemented.

=== Vitamin A ===
Cats cannot synthesize vitamin A from plant beta-carotene, and therefore must be supplemented with retinol from meat. A deficiency in vitamin A will result in a poor coat, hair loss, and scaly, thickened skin. However, an excess of vitamin A, called hypervitaminosis A, can result from over feeding cod liver oil and large amounts of liver. Signs of hypervitaminosis A are overly sensitive skin and neck pain, causing the cat to be unwilling to groom itself, resulting in a poor coat. Supplementing vitamin A with retinol to a deficient cat and feeding a balanced diet to a cat with hypervitaminosis A will treat the underlying nutritional disorder.

=== Vitamin B ===
The cat must have a supply of niacin, as cats cannot convert tryptophan into niacin. However, diets high in corn and low in protein can result in skin lesions and scaly, dry, greasy skin with hair loss. A deficiency of the B vitamin biotin causes hair loss around the eyes and face. A lack of B vitamins can be corrected by supplementing with a vitamin B complex and brewer's yeast.

== See also ==
- Psychogenic alopecia
