= Miliary dermatitis =

Skin condition in cats

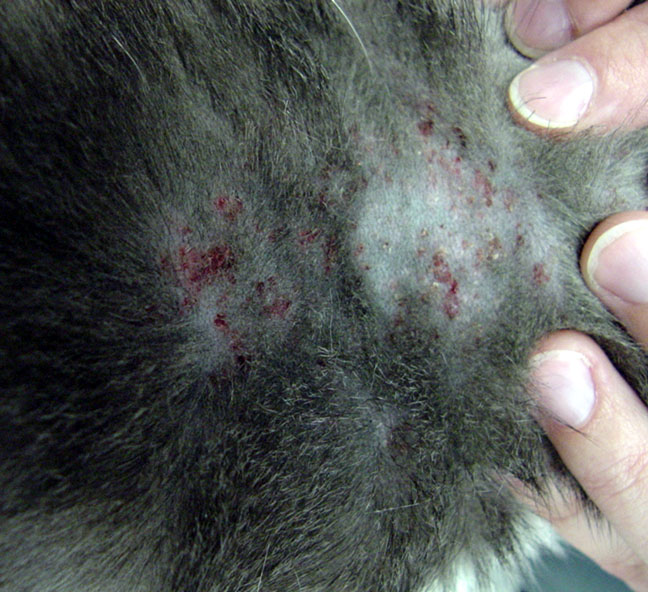
Miliary dermatitis secondary to flea allergy

In veterinary medicine, miliary dermatitis is a multifocal distribution of skin lesions, with no identifiable pattern. The term miliary means millet-like, as the papules on the coat of an affected cat feel similar to millet seeds.

== Causes ==
Miliary dermatitis is classified as a cutaneous reaction pattern of inflammation and can be the manifestation of a wide variety of skin allergies, infections or parasitic infestations. The majority of cases are associated with feline flea allergy dermatitis.

== Clinical Signs ==
Cats with miliary dermatitis have a rash consisting of fine papules surmounted by small crusts. Although most are unaffected by rash, where noticed a broad rash can be concentrated to the back of the neck, scapular (shoulder blade) and surrounding areas, and/or the lower abdomen and surrounding areas. Secondary infection with Staphylococcus intermedius is common. Signs include itchiness, "elevated grooming", and visible spots of fur-loss.

== Treatment ==
The basis of the treatment is identification and management of the underlying cause. Cats may also be treated with antibiotics and cortisone drugs. The disease may be chronic and recurrent.

== See also ==
- Cat skin disorders
