= Feather meal =

Poultry feather product

Feather meal, sometimes feather powder, is a byproduct of processing poultry; it is made from poultry feathers by partially grinding them under elevated heat and pressure, and then grinding and drying. Although total nitrogen levels are fairly high (up to 12%), the bioavailability of this nitrogen may be low if not hydrolyzed beforehand. Feather meal is used in formulated animal feed and in organic fertilizer.

Worldwide, approximately 50 billion chickens were used for human consumption in 2014. The feather from poultry slaughtering is traditionally treated as waste, with carbon emissions associated with its disposal. Reusing feather meal produces extra value while reducing carbon emissions.

== Animal feed ==
When used as animal feed, the indigestible keratin must be broken down (partially hydrolyzed) to become digestible for animals. One process for doing this is called rendering: steam pressure cookers with temperatures over 140 °C (284 °F) are used to "cook" and sterilize the feathers. It is then dried, cooled and ground into a powder for use as a protein source for animal feed (mostly ruminants and fish).

There are many other ways to achieve hydrolysis such as acid treatment, fermentation, and enzyme-processing.

== Plant fertilizer ==
Feather meal contains a large amount of nitrogen (15%) and sulfur (2.4%). It is rich in plant micronutrients such as iron and zinc. Being neither synthetic or petroleum-based, it is considered an organic fertilizer.

Native (non-hydrolyzed) feather meal is a semi slow-release fertilizer. The nitrogen is slowly released through decomposition by soil microbes. It is not water-soluble and hence does not make a good liquid fertilizer. When adding it to a garden as a nitrogen source, it must be blended into the soil to start the decomposition to make the nitrogenous compounds available to the plants.

Hydrolyzed feather meal releases nitrogen quickly.

Being high-nitrogen fertilizers, both types of feather meal are useful for increasing the growth of green leaves. Both are also good for encouraging the growth of microbes, improving soil structure, and activating the composting process.

== Issues ==
Some countries allow or allowed the addition of organoarsenic drugs such as roxarsone (a coccidiostat) to chicken feed. A 2012 study found that the use of feather meal may contribute to inorganic arsenic exposure in humans. It examined feathers from the US and China, which both allowed the use of roxarsone at the time. The US banned its use in 2013. A 2021 Chinese study found significantly elevated levels of arsenic in soil around chicken farms, though still at an amount with negligible risks for human health.

Antibiotics and other drugs fed to chicken also end up in feathers. Some of these drugs are not broken down during rendering. The antibiotic residue is enough to cause statistically significant (p = 0.01) inhibition in the growth of non-resistant bacteria, while having no effect on resistant bacteria.

== See also ==
- Hydrolyzed protein
- Arsenic poisoning

== Sources ==
- Organic gardening information
