= Surround optical-fiber immunoassay =

Surround optical fiber immunoassay
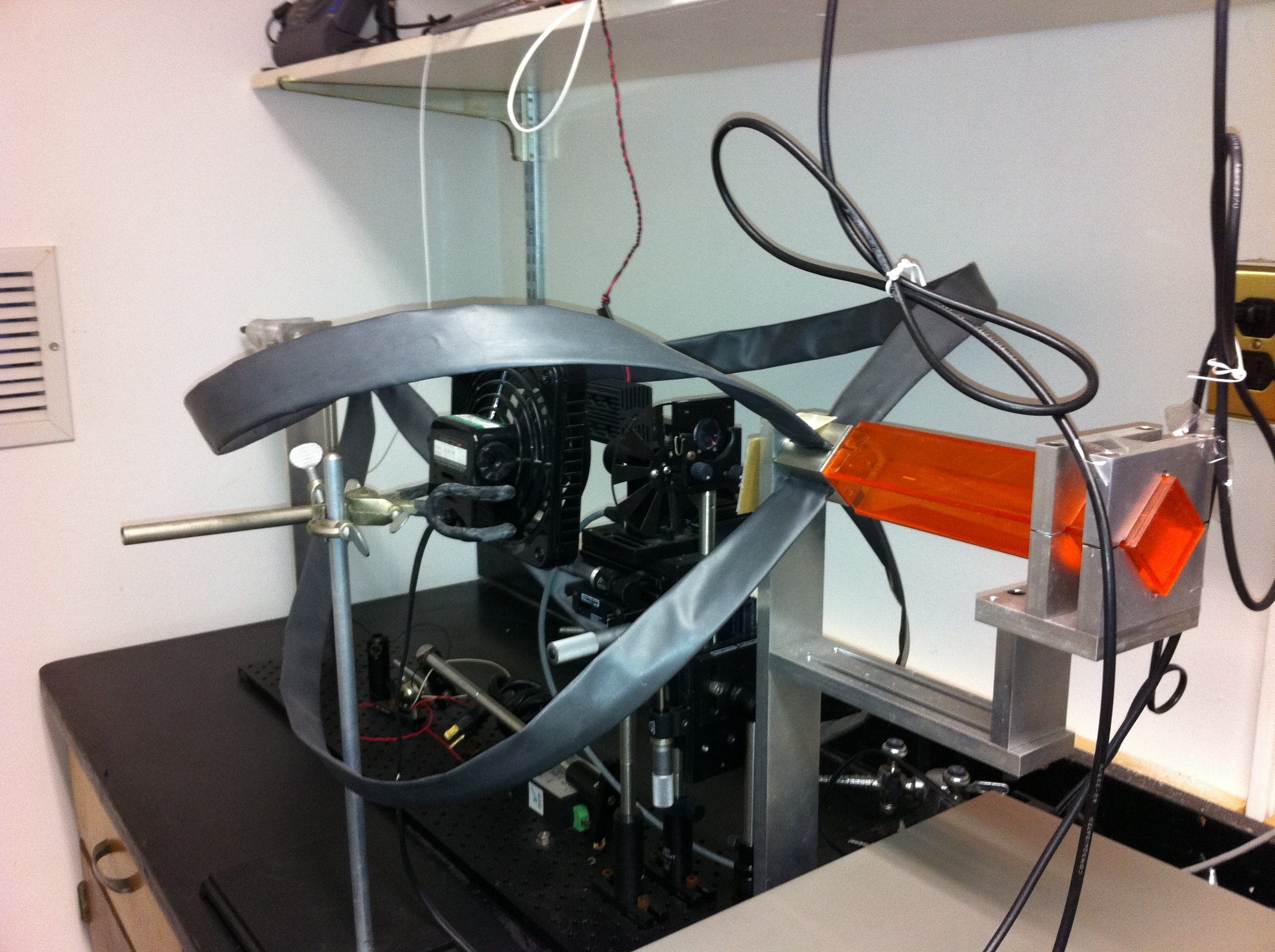
- A prototype version of surround optical fiber immunoassay
- Acronym: SOFIA
- Uses: Medical, food safety, industrial, veterinary
- Notable experiments: Detection of prions in urine and blood of preclinical carriers
- Inventor: Los Alamos National Laboratory and SUNY
- Model: Prototype

Surround optical-fiber immunoassay (SOFIA) is an ultrasensitive, in vitro diagnostic platform incorporating a surround optical-fiber assembly that captures fluorescence emissions from an entire sample. The technology's defining characteristics are its extremely high sensitivity and dynamic range, and extremely low limit of detection. SOFIA's sensitivity is measured at the attogram level (10^{−18} g), making it about one billion times more sensitive than conventional diagnostic techniques. Based on its enhanced dynamic range, SOFIA is able to discriminate levels of analyte in a sample over 10 orders of magnitude, facilitating accurate titering.

As a diagnostic platform, SOFIA has a broad range of applications. Several studies have already demonstrated SOFIA's unprecedented ability to detect naturally occurring prions in the blood and urine of disease carriers. This is expected to lead to the first reliable ante mortem screening test for vCJD, BSE, scrapie, CWD, and other transmissible spongiform encephalopathies. Given the technology's extreme sensitivity, additional unique applications are anticipated, including in vitro tests for other neurodegenerative diseases, such as Alzheimer's and Parkinson's disease.

SOFIA was developed as a result of a joint-collaborative research project between Los Alamos National Laboratory and State University of New York, and was supported by the Department of Defense's National Prion Research Program.

== Background ==
The conventional method of performing laser-induced fluorescence, as well as other types of spectroscopic measurements, such as infrared, ultraviolet-visible spectroscopy, phosphorescence, etc., is to use a small transparent laboratory vessel, a cuvette, to contain the sample to be analyzed.

To perform a measurement, the cuvette is filled with the liquid to be investigated and then illuminated with a laser focused through one of the cuvette's faces. A lens is placed in line with one of the faces of the cuvette located at 90° from the input window to collect the laser-induced fluorescent light. Only a small volume of the cuvette is actually illuminated by the laser and produces a detectable spectroscopic emission. The output signal is significantly reduced because the lens picks up only about 10% of the spectroscopic emission due to solid angle considerations. This technique has been used for at least 75 years; even before the laser existed, when conventional light sources were used to excite the fluorescence.

SOFIA solves the problem of low collection efficiency, as it collects nearly all of the fluorescent light produced from the sample being analyzed, increasing the amount of fluorescence signal by around a factor of 10 over conventional apparatus.

=== Technological advantages ===
SOFIA is an apparatus and method for improved optical geometry for enhancement of spectroscopic detection of analytes in a sample. The invention has already demonstrated its proof-of-concept functionality as an apparatus and method for ultrasensitive detection of prions and other low-level analytes. SOFIA combines the specificity inherent in monoclonal antibodies for antigen capture with the sensitivity of surround optical detection technology. To detect extremely low signal levels, a low-noise, photovoltaic diode is used as the detector for the system. SOFIA uses a laser to illuminate a microcapillary tube holding the sample. Then, the light collected from the sample is directed to transfer optics from optical fibers. Next, the light is optically filtered for detection, which is performed as a current measurement amplified against noise by a digital signal processing lock-in amplified. The results are displayed on a computer and software designed for data acquisition.

The advantages of such a detection array are numerous. Primarily, it permits the use of very small samples at low concentration to be optimally interrogated using the laser-induced fluorescence technique. This fiber-based detection system is adaptable to existing short-pulsed detection hardware that was originally developed for sequencing single DNA molecules. The geometry is also amenable to deployment for short-pulse laser, single-molecule detection schemes. The multiport geometry of the system allows efficient electronic processing of the signals from each arm of the device. Finally, and perhaps most importantly, fiberoptic cables are essentially 100% efficient in optical transmission, having an attenuation less than 10 dB/km. Thus, once deployed for use in a facility, the fluorescence information can be fiberoptically transmitted to a remote location, where data processing and analysis can be performed.

== Components of SOFIA ==
SOFIA comprises a multiwell plate sample container, an automated means for successively transporting samples from the multiwell plate sample container to a transparent capillary contained within a sample holder, an excitation source in optical communication with the sample, wherein radiation from the excitation source is directed along the length of the capillary, and wherein the radiation induces a signal which is emitted from the sample, and, at least one linear array.

== Steps in SOFIA ==
=== Assay preparation ===
After amplifying and then concentrating the target analyte, the samples are labeled with a fluorescent dye using an antibody for specificity and then finally loaded into a microcapillary tube. This tube is placed in a specially constructed apparatus so it is totally surrounded by optical fibers to capture all light emitted once the dye is excited using a laser.

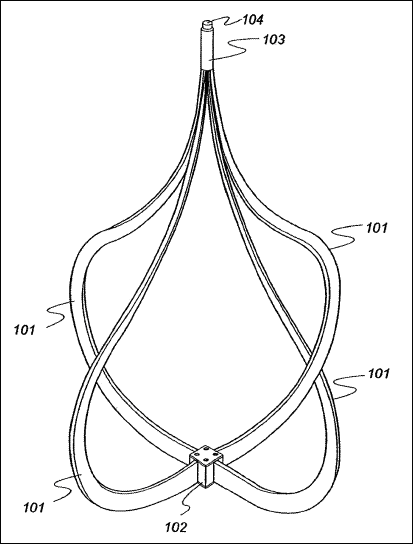
Figure 1: A schematic representation of SOFIA

=== Instrumentation processing ===
This equipment is a spectroscopic (light gathering) apparatus and corresponding method for rapidly detecting and analyzing analytes in a sample. The sample is irradiated by an excitation source in optical communication with the sample. The excitation source may include, but is not limited to, a laser, a flash lamp, an arc lamp, a light-emitting diode, or the like.

Figure 1 depicts the current version of the SOFIA system. Four linear arrays (101) extend from a sample holder (102), which houses an elongated, transparent sample container which is open at both ends, to an end port (103). The distal end of the endport (104) is inserted into an end port assembly (200). The linear arrays (101) comprise a plurality of optical fibers having a first end and a second end, the plurality of optical fibers optionally surrounded by a protective and/or insulating sheath. The optical fibers are linearly arranged, meaning that they are substantially coplanar with respect to one another so as to form an elongated row of fibers.

== Applications ==
The analyte of interest may be biological or chemical in nature, and by way of example, only may include chemical moieties (toxins, metabolites, drugs and drug residues), peptides, proteins, cellular components, viruses, and combinations thereof. The analyte of interest may be in either a fluid or a supporting medium, such as a gel.

SOFIA has demonstrated its potential as a device with a wide range of applications. These include clinical applications, such as detecting diseases, discovering predispositions to pathologies, establishing a diagnosis and tracking the effectiveness of prescribed treatments, and nonclinical applications, such as preventing the entry of toxins and other pathogenic agents into products intended for human consumption:

- Clinical applications – SOFIA may be used to conduct both qualitative tests (either positive or negative results) to detect or identify bacteria or viruses, and quantitative tests (measuring substances) to detect or quantify biological constants or markers, which are substances produced by the body in the presence of, for example, an infectious disease (to allow determination of viral load, for instance, in AIDS therapy, or the level of toxicity in drugs of abuse detection).
- Nonclinical applications - As an immunoassay, SOFIA can potentially be used on a wider scale to monitor the quality of food, pharmaceuticals, cosmetics, or water, as well as general environmental parameters and agricultural products. The ability to detect and screen bacteria and toxins for a wide range of products is a growing and more complex requirement as may be evidenced by the increase incidence of food- and animal-borne diseases, such as E. coli, Salmonella, BSE, avian influenza, etc.

=== Ante mortem test for prion diseases ===
SOFIA has been used to rapidly detect the abnormal form of the prion protein (PrP^{Sc}) in samples of bodily fluids, such as blood or urine. PrP^{Sc} is the marker protein used in diagnostics for transmissible spongiform encephalopathies (TSEs), examples of which include bovine spongiform encephalopathy in cattle (i.e. “mad cow” disease), scrapie in sheep, and Creutzfeldt–Jakob disease in humans. Currently, no rapid means exists for the ante mortem detection of PrP^{Sc} in the dilute quantities in which it usually appears in bodily fluids. SOFIA has the advantages of requiring little sample preparation, and allowing for electronic diagnostic equipment to be placed outside the containment area.

==== Background ====
TSEs, or prion diseases, are infectious neurodegenerative diseases of mammals that include bovine spongiform encephalopathy, chronic wasting disease of deer and elk, scrapie in sheep, and Creutzfeldt–Jakob disease (CJD) in humans. TSEs may be passed from host to host by ingestion of infected tissues or blood transfusions. Clinical symptoms of TSEs include loss of movement and coordination and dementia in humans. They have incubation periods of months to years, but after the appearance of clinical signs, they progress rapidly, are untreatable and invariably are fatal. Attempts at TSE risk-reduction have led to significant changes in the production and trade of agricultural goods, medicines, cosmetics, blood and tissue donations, and biotechnology products. Post mortem neuropathological examination of brain tissue from an animal or human has remained the ‘gold standard’ of TSE diagnosis and is very specific, but not as sensitive as other techniques.

To improve food safety, it would be beneficial to screen all the animals for prion diseases using ante mortem, preclinical testing, i.e., testing prior to presentation of symptoms. However, PrP^{Sc} levels are very low in presymptomatic hosts. In addition, PrP^{Sc}s are generally unevenly distributed in body tissues, with highest concentration consistently found in nervous system tissues and very low concentrations in easily accessible body fluids such as blood or urine. Therefore, any such test would be required to detect extremely small amounts of PrP and would have to differentiate PrP^{C} and PrP^{Sc}.

Current PrP^{Sc} detection methods are time-consuming and employ post mortem analysis after suspicious animals manifest one or more symptoms of the disease. Current diagnostic methods are based mainly on detection of physiochemical differences between PrP^{C} and PrP^{Sc} which, to date, are the only reliable markers for TSEs. For example, the most widely used diagnostic tests exploit the relative protease resistance of PrP^{Sc} in brain samples to discriminate between PrP^{C} and PrP^{Sc}, in combination with antibody-based detection of the PK-resistant portion of PrP^{Sc}. It has as yet not been possible to detect prion diseases by using conventional methods, such as polymerase chain reaction, serology, or cell culture assays. An agent-specific nucleic acid has not yet been identified, and the infected host does not elicit an antibody response.

The conformationally altered form of PrP^{C} is PrP^{Sc}. Some groups believe PrP^{Sc} is the infectious agent (prion agent) in TSEs, while other groups do not. PrP^{Sc} could be a neuropathological product of the disease process, a component of the infectious agent, the infectious agent itself, or something else altogether. Regardless of what its actual function in the disease state is, PrP^{Sc} is clearly specifically associated with the disease process, and detection of it indicates infection with the agent causing prion diseases.

==== SOFIA as an ante mortem test for prion diseases ====
SOFIA provides, among other things, methods to diagnose prion diseases by detection of PrP^{Sc} in biological samples. Samples can be brain tissue, nerve tissue, blood, urine, lymphatic fluid, cerebrospinal fluid, or a combination thereof. Absence of PrP^{Sc} indicates no infection with the infectious agent up to the detection limits of the methods. Detection of a presence of PrP^{Sc} indicates infection with the infectious agent associated with prion disease. Infection with the prion agent may be detected in both presymptomatic and symptomatic stages of disease progression.

These and other improvements have been achieved with SOFIA. SOFIA's sensitivity and specificity eliminates the need for PK digestion to distinguish between the normal and abnormal PrP isoforms. Further detection of PrP^{Sc} in blood plasma has been addressed by limited protein misfolding cyclic amplification (PMCA) followed by SOFIA. Because of the sensitivity of SOFIA, PMCA cycles can be reduced, thus decreasing the chances of spontaneous PrP^{Sc} formation and the detection of false-positive samples. SOFIA meets the needs of increased sensitivity in the detection of prion diseases in both presymptomatic and symptomatic TSE infected animals, including humans, by providing methods of analysis using highly sensitive instrumentation, which requires less sample preparation than previously described methods, in combination with recently developed Mabs against PrP. The method of the present version of SOFIA provides sensitivity levels sufficient to detect PrP^{Sc} in brain tissue. When coupled with limited sPMCA, the methods of the present inventions provide sensitivity levels sufficient to detect PrP^{Sc} in blood plasma, tissue and other fluids collected antemortem.

The methods combine the specificity of the Mabs for antigen capture and concentration with the sensitivity of a surround optical fiber detection technology. In contrast to previously described methods for detection of PrP^{Sc} in brain homogenates, these techniques, when used to study brain homogenates, do not use seeded polymerization, amplification, or enzymatic digestion (for example, by proteinase K, or “PK”). This is important in that previous reports have indicated the existence of PrP^{Sc} isoforms with varied PK sensitivity, which decreases reliability of the assay. The sensitivity of this assay makes it suitable as a platform for rapid prion detection assay in biological fluids. In addition to prion diseases, the method may provide a means for rapid, high-throughput testing for a wide spectrum of infections and disorders.

While about 40 cycles of sPMCA combined with immunoprecipitation were found to be inadequate for PrP^{Sc} detection in plasma by ELISA or western blotting, the PrP^{Sc} has also been found to be readily measured by SOFIA methods. The limited numbers of cycles necessary for the present assay platform virtually eliminates the possibility of obtaining PMCA-related false-positive results such as those previously reported (Thorne and Terry, 2008).

=== Other clinical applications ===
With rapid developments in the field of biomarker research, many infections and disorders that have not been possible to diagnose via in vitro testing, are becoming increasingly possible. SOFIA is predicted to be of broader use in diagnostic assay development for infections and disorders beyond the scope of prion diseases. A major potential application is for other protein misfolding diseases, in particular Alzheimer's.

== Published research ==
A 2011 study reported the detection of prions in urine from naturally and orally infected sheep with clinical scrapie agent and orally infected preclinical and infected white-tailed deer with clinical chronic wasting disease (CWD). This is the first report on prion detection of PrP^{Sc} from the urine of naturally or preclinical prion-diseased ovines or cervids.

A 2010 study demonstrated a moderate amount of protein misfolding cyclic amplification (PMCA) coupled to a novel SOFIA detection scheme, can be used to detect PrP^{Sc} in protease-untreated plasma from preclinical and clinical scrapie sheep, and white-tailed deer with chronic wasting disease, following natural and experimental infection. The disease-associated form of the prion protein (PrP^{Sc}), resulting from a conformational change of the normal (cellular) form of prion protein (PrP^{C}), is considered central to neuropathogenesis and serves as the only reliable molecular marker for prion disease diagnosis. While the highest levels of PrP^{Sc} are present in the CNS, the development of a reasonable diagnostic assay requires the use of body fluids which characteristically contains extremely low levels of PrP^{Sc}. PrP^{Sc} has been detected in the blood of sick animals by means of PMCA technology. However, repeated cycling over several days, which is necessary for PMCA of blood material, has been reported to result in decreased specificity (false positives). To generate an assay for PrP^{Sc} in blood that is both highly sensitive and specific, the researchers used limited serial PMCA (sPMCA) with SOFIA. They did not find any enhancement of sPMCA with the addition of polyadenylic acid, nor was it necessary to match the genotypes of the PrP^{C} and PrP^{Sc} sources for efficient amplification.

A 2009 study found SOFIA, in its current format, is capable of detecting less than 10 attogram (ag) of hamster, sheep and deer recombinant PrP. About 10 ag of PrP^{Sc} from 263K-infected hamster brains can be detected with similar lower limits of PrP^{Sc} detection from the brains of scrapie-infected sheep and deer infected with chronic wasting disease. These detection limits allow protease-treated and untreated material to be diluted beyond the point where PrP^{C}, nonspecific proteins or other extraneous material may interfere with PrP^{Sc} signal detection and/or specificity. This not only eliminates the issue of specificity of PrP^{Sc} detection, but also increases sensitivity, since the possibility of partial PrP^{Sc} proteolysis is no longer a concern. SOFIA will likely lead to early ante mortem detection of transmissible encephalopathies and is also amenable for use with additional target amplification protocols. SOFIA represents a sensitive means for detecting specific proteins involved in disease pathogenesis and/or diagnosis that extends beyond the scope of the transmissible spongiform encephalopathies.

== See also ==
- Immunoassay
