= Variant Creutzfeldt–Jakob disease =

Degenerative brain disease caused by prions

- Other names: New variant Creutzfeldt–Jakob disease (nvCJD) (dated), human mad cow disease, human BSE (colloquial)
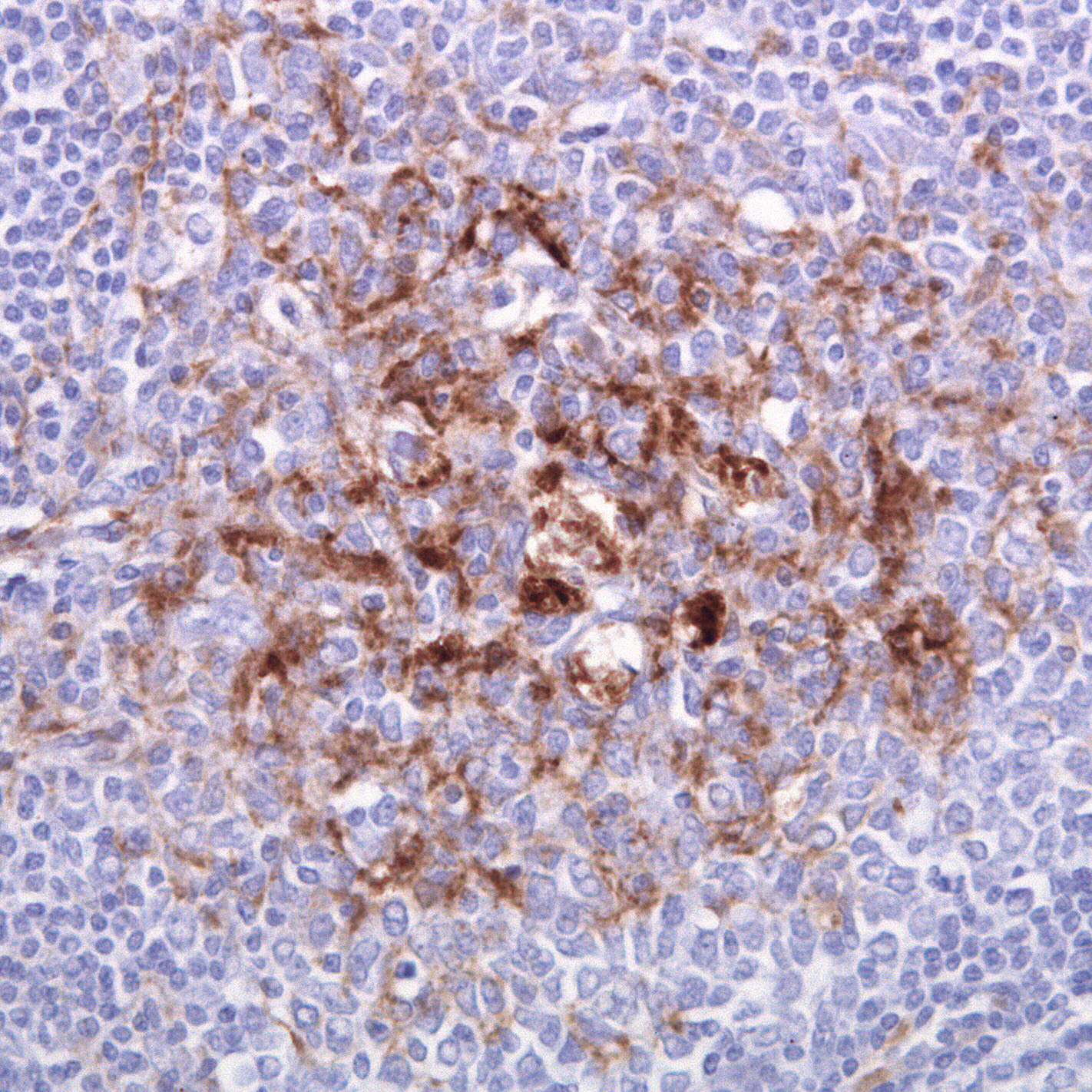
- Biopsy of the tonsil in variant CJD. PrP^{sc} deposits are stained brown and are visible.
- Specialty: Infectious disease, Neurology
- Symptoms: Initial: Psychiatric problems, behavioral changes, painful sensations Later: Poor coordination, dementia, hallucinations, involuntary movements
- Complications: Aspiration pneumonia, akinetic mutism
- Usual onset: Years after initial exposure
- Duration: ~13-month life expectancy after onset of symptoms
- Causes: Prions, specifically PrP^{BSE}
- Risk factors: Eating beef from cows with bovine spongiform encephalopathy
- Diagnostic method: Suspected based on symptoms, confirmed by brain biopsy, Protein misfolding cyclic amplification (PMCA), or Real-time quaking-induced conversion (RT-QuIC)
- Differential diagnosis: Multiple sclerosis, classic Creutzfeldt–Jakob disease
- Prevention: Not eating contaminated beef
- Treatment: Supportive care
- Medication: Pentosan polysulfate (experimental), morphine, methadone (for pain relief), clonazepam, valproate (for involuntary movements), haloperidol (for agitation)
- Prognosis: Always fatal
- Frequency: Fewer than 250 reported cases as of 2012
- Deaths: 178 in the United Kingdom as of 2024

Variant Creutzfeldt–Jakob disease (vCJD), formerly known as new variant Creutzfeldt–Jakob disease (nvCJD) and referred to colloquially as "Creutzfeldt–Jakob Disease", "mad cow disease" or "human mad cow disease" (to distinguish it from its BSE counterpart), is a fatal type of brain disease within the transmissible spongiform encephalopathy family. Initial symptoms include psychiatric problems, behavioral changes, and painful sensations. In the later stages of the illness, patients may exhibit poor coordination, dementia and involuntary movements. The length of time between exposure and the development of symptoms is unclear, but is believed to be years to decades. Average life expectancy following the onset of symptoms is 13 months.

It is caused by prions, which are misfolded proteins. Spread is believed to be primarily due to eating beef infected with BSE. Infection is also believed to require a specific genetic susceptibility. Spread may potentially also occur via blood products or contaminated surgical equipment. Diagnosis is by brain biopsy but can be suspected based on certain other criteria. It is different from typical Creutzfeldt–Jakob disease, though both are due to prions.

Treatment for vCJD involves supportive care. As of 2020, 178 cases of vCJD have been recorded in the United Kingdom, due to a 1990s outbreak, and 50 cases in the rest of the world. The disease has become less common since 2000. The typical age of onset is less than 30 years old. It was first identified in 1996 by the National CJD Surveillance Unit in Edinburgh, Scotland. Controversial research by Harash Narang, who worked as a virologist at the Public Health Laboratory Service (PHLS) suggested a link between BSE and CJD as early as 1989.

== Signs and symptoms ==
Initial symptoms include psychiatric problems, behavioral changes, and painful sensations. In the later stages of the illness, patients may exhibit poor coordination, dementia and involuntary movements. The length of time between exposure and the development of symptoms is unclear, but is believed to be years. Average life expectancy following the onset of symptoms is 13 months.

== Cause ==
=== Tainted beef ===
In Britain, the primary cause of vCJD has been eating beef tainted with bovine spongiform encephalopathy. A 2012 study by the Health Protection Agency found that around 1 in 2000 had abnormal prions present in appendix cells.

Jonathan Quick, instructor of medicine at the Department of Global Health and Social Medicine at Harvard Medical School, stated that bovine spongiform encephalopathy (BSE) is the first man-made epidemic, or "Frankenstein" disease, because a human decision to feed meat and bone meal to previously herbivorous cattle (as a source of protein) caused what was previously an animal pathogen to enter into the human food chain, and from there to begin causing humans to contract vCJD.

The risk of contracting vCJD from ingestion of cattle products has led to many countries banning the import of beef from countries where BSE has been known to occur, such as the ban on beef from the United States imposed by Japan, South Korea, Mexico, Canada, and other countries in 2003 immediately following the first reported case of BSE in American cattle. Stringent preventative and surveillance practices implemented since then to prevent the disease from entering the human and cattle food chains have caused some to conclude that such bans are unnecessary.

=== Blood products ===
As of 2018, evidence suggests that there may be prions in the blood of individuals with vCJD, but this is not the case in individuals with sporadic CJD.

In 2004, a report showed that vCJD can be transmitted by blood transfusions. The finding alarmed healthcare officials because a large epidemic of the disease could result in the near future. A blood test for vCJD infection is possible but is not yet available for screening blood donations. Significant restrictions exist to protect the blood supply. The UK government banned anyone who had received a blood transfusion since January 1980 from donating blood. Since 1999 there has been a ban in the UK for using UK blood to manufacture fractional products such as albumin. Whilst these restrictions may go some way to preventing a self-sustaining epidemic of secondary infections, the number of infected blood donations is unknown and could be considerable. In June 2013 the government was warned that deaths, then at 176, could rise five-fold through blood transfusions.

On 28 May 2002, the United States Food and Drug Administration instituted a policy that excludes from blood donation anyone having spent at least six months in certain European countries (or three months in the United Kingdom) from 1980 to 1996. Given the large number of U.S. military personnel and their dependents residing in Europe, it was expected that over 7% of donors would be deferred due to the policy. Later changes to this policy first relaxed the restriction to a cumulative total of five years or more of civilian travel in European countries (six months or more if military) then, in 2022, removed it entirely.

In New Zealand, the New Zealand Blood Service (NZBS) in 2000 introduced measures to preclude permanently donors having resided in the United Kingdom (including the Isle of Man and the Channel Islands) for a total of six months or more between January 1980 and December 1996. The measure resulted in ten percent of New Zealand's active blood donors at the time becoming ineligible to donate blood. In 2003, the NZBS further extended restrictions to permanently preclude donors having received a blood transfusion in the United Kingdom since January 1980, and in April 2006, restrictions were further extended to include the Republic of Ireland and France. The restriction was rescinded in late February 2024.

In Canada, individuals were formerly ineligible to donate blood or plasma if they had spent a cumulative total of three months or more in the mainland UK or its Crown Dependencies or six months or more in Saudi Arabia from January 1, 1980, through December 31, 1996. They were also ineligible if they had spent a cumulative total of five years or more in France or the Republic of Ireland from January 1, 1980, through 31 December 2001. These restrictions were removed by December 2023.

In Poland, anyone having spent cumulatively six months or longer between 1 January 1980 and 31 December 1996 in the UK, Ireland, or France is permanently barred from donating.

In France, anyone having lived or stayed in the United Kingdom a total of over one year between 1 January 1980 and 31 December 1996 is permanently barred from donating.

In the Czech Republic, anyone having spent more than twelve months in the UK or France between 1980 and 1996 or received transfusion in the UK after the year 1980 is not allowed to donate blood.

In Finland, anyone having lived or stayed in the mainland United Kingdom or its Crown Dependencies for a total of over six months between 1 January 1980 and 31 December 1996 was formerly barred from donating; the restriction was removed in March 2026.

=== Sperm donation ===
In the U.S., the FDA has banned import of any donor sperm, motivated by a risk of variant Creutzfeldt–Jakob disease, inhibiting the once popular import of Scandinavian sperm. Despite this, the scientific consensus is that the risk is negligible, as there is no evidence Creutzfeldt–Jakob is sexually transmitted.

=== Occupational contamination ===
In France, the last two victims of variant Creutzfeldt–Jakob disease, who died in 2019 and 2021, were research technicians at the National Research Institute for Agriculture, Food and the Environment (INRAE). Émilie Jaumain, who died in 2019, at the age of 33, had been the victim of a work accident in 2010, during which she had pricked herself with a tool contaminated with infected brain. The efficacy of this route of contamination was subsequently demonstrated in primates. Pierrette C., who died in 2021, had been victim of the same type of work accident; after her diagnosis, a moratorium was initiated in all French laboratories on research activities on infectious prions. In March 2022, INRAE recognized the occupational cause of these two deaths, raising serious questions about the safety of personnel in these laboratories. Inspections noted failures in the protection of agents in the face of this deadly risk, and the long incubation period of this disease led to fears of new cases in the future.

=== False link to consumption of squirrel brains ===
A 1997 article in The Lancet postulated that a connection existed between the consumption of squirrel brains and CJD. Media reporting on this myth was reignited in 2018 when an article by Live Science reported on a Rochester man who was alleged to have contracted vCJD from his consumption of squirrel brains.

Creutzfeldt-Jakob Disease and eating squirrel brains, the 1997 article by The Lancet, has been almost entirely discredited due its lack of scientific evidence and false statistical assumptions. An article published by The New Yorker in the year 2000, shortly following the release of the 1997 Lancet article, was one of the first to report on the lack of scientific footing for The Lancet's study. It reported that many issues revolved around the researchers conflating statistical correlation with epidemiological causation. This is especially important with a slow moving and hard to trace disease like vCJD, a point emphasized in their statement that "the Lancet study blundered blithely into such statistical pitfalls".

In 2018, the Creutzfeldt–Jakob Disease Foundation dismissed the connection between consumption of squirrel brains and vCJD, addressing both the 1997 Lancet article and Live Science article. This statement was part of a press release, reading that

The previous ProMed commentary mentioned a 1997 Lancet report that hypothesized about a potential link between consumption of squirrel brains and CJD; there was no mention of vCJD in that report. Since that brief report, there has been no convincing evidence found suggesting that the consumption of squirrel meat, brain or otherwise, is a risk factor for any prion disease. While prion diseases have been identified in several other types of mammals, they have never been identified in squirrels. Without additional experimental or epidemiological evidence, a link between consumption of squirrel brain and human prion disease is unjustifiably speculative.

An article in Democrat and Chronicle provided another primary source debunking this myth. This report included interviews with the epidemiologist overseeing the 2018 case reported on by Live Science. In a statement, Dr. Emil Lesho stated that "We never thought squirrel brains".

Despite the fact that there is no scientific basis for this connection, much reporting surrounds both the 1997 Lancet article, and the 2018 Live Science article, most echoing their statements. Although eating the nervous tissue of any mammal is not recommended due to the risk of disease transmission, fundamentally, there is no robust scientific evidence that the consumption of squirrel brains presents a risk factor for vCJD at any level, or has ever caused a case of vCJD in humans.

== Mechanism ==
Despite the consumption of contaminated beef in the UK being high, vCJD has infected a small number of people. One explanation for this can be found in the genetics of people with the disease. The human PRNP protein which is subverted in prion disease can occur with either methionine or valine at amino acid 129, without any apparent physiological difference. Of the overall white population, about 40% have two methionine-containing alleles, 10% have two valine-containing alleles, and the other 50% are heterozygous at this position. Only a single person with vCJD tested was found to be heterozygous; most of those affected had two copies of the methionine-containing form. It is not yet known whether those unaffected are actually immune or only have a longer incubation period until symptoms appear. Studies in transgenetic mice indicate that all of these genotypes can be affected.

== Diagnosis ==
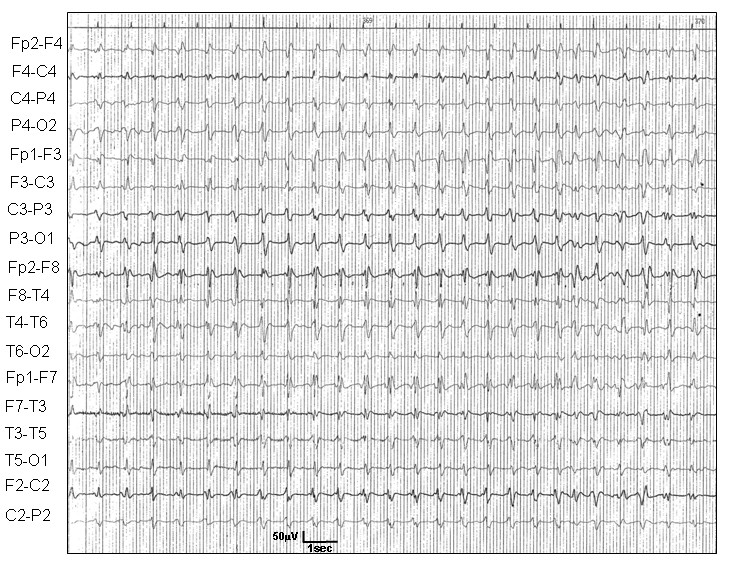
Electroencephalogram of a person with suspected CJD showing typical periodic bursts of triphasic sharp waves

=== Definitive ===
Examination of brain tissue is required to confirm a diagnosis of variant CJD. The following confirmatory features should be present:

- Numerous widespread kuru-type amyloid plaques surrounded by vacuoles in both the cerebellum and cerebrum – florid plaques.
- Spongiform change and extensive prion protein deposition shown by immunohistochemistry throughout the cerebellum and cerebrum.

=== Suspected ===
- Current age or age at death less than 55 years (a brain autopsy is recommended, however, for all physician-diagnosed CJD cases).
- Psychiatric symptoms at illness onset and/or persistent painful sensory symptoms (frank pain and/or dysesthesia).
- Dementia, and development ≥4 months after illness onset of at least two of the following five neurologic signs: poor coordination, myoclonus, chorea, hyperreflexia, or visual signs. (If persistent painful sensory symptoms exist, ≥4 months' delay in the development of the neurologic signs is not required).
- A normal or an abnormal EEG, but not the diagnostic EEG changes often seen in classic CJD.
- Duration of illness of over 6 months.
- Routine investigations do not suggest an alternative, non-CJD diagnosis.
- No history of getting human pituitary growth hormone or a dura mater graft from a cadaver.
- No history of CJD in a first degree relative or prion protein gene mutation in the person.

=== Classification ===
vCJD is a separate condition from classic Creutzfeldt–Jakob disease (though both are caused by PrP prions). Both classic and variant CJD are subtypes of Creutzfeldt–Jakob disease. There are three main categories of CJD disease: sporadic CJD, hereditary CJD, and acquired CJD, with variant CJD being in the acquired group along with iatrogenic CJD. The classic form includes sporadic and hereditary forms. Sporadic CJD is the most common type.

ICD-10 has no separate code for vCJD and such cases are reported under the Creutzfeldt–Jakob disease code (A81.0).

== Epidemiology ==
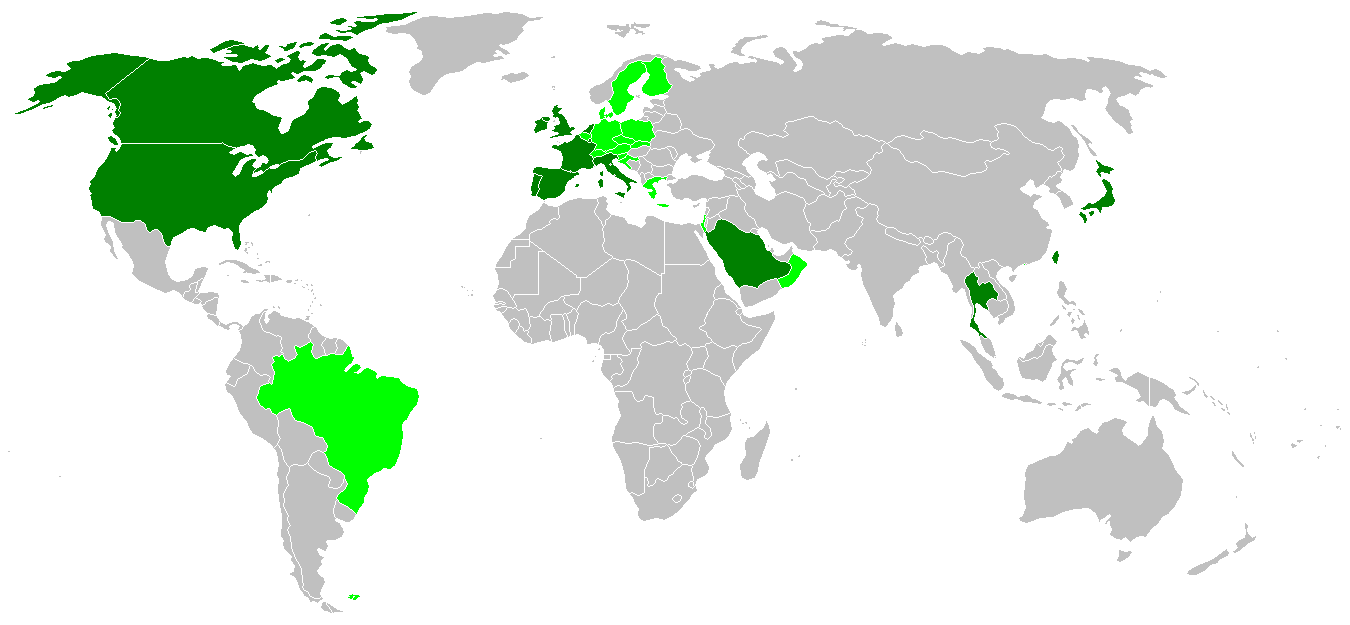
Dark green areas are countries that have confirmed human cases of variant Creutzfeldt–Jakob disease and light green are countries that have bovine spongiform encephalopathy cases

The Lancet in 2006 suggested that it may take more than 50 years for vCJD to develop, from their studies of kuru, a similar disease in Papua New Guinea. The reasoning behind the claim is that kuru was possibly transmitted through cannibalism in Papua New Guinea when family members would eat the body of a dead relative as a sign of mourning. In the 1950s, cannibalism was banned in Papua New Guinea. In the late 20th century, however, kuru reached epidemic proportions in certain Papua New Guinean communities, therefore suggesting that vCJD may also have a similar incubation period of 20 to 50 years. A critique to this theory is that while mortuary cannibalism was banned in Papua New Guinea in the 1950s, that does not necessarily mean that the practice ended. Fifteen years later Jared Diamond was informed by Papuans that the practice continued.

These researchers noticed a genetic variation in some people with kuru that has been known to promote long incubation periods. They have also proposed that individuals having contracted CJD in the early 1990s represent a distinct genetic subpopulation, with unusually short incubation periods for bovine spongiform encephalopathy (BSE). This means that there may be many more people with vCJD with longer incubation periods, which may surface many years later.

Prion protein is detectable in lymphoid and appendix tissue up to two years before the onset of neurological symptoms in vCJD. Large scale studies in the UK have yielded an estimated prevalence of 493 per million, higher than the actual number of reported cases. This finding indicates a large number of asymptomatic cases and the need to monitor.

== Society and culture ==
=== United Kingdom ===
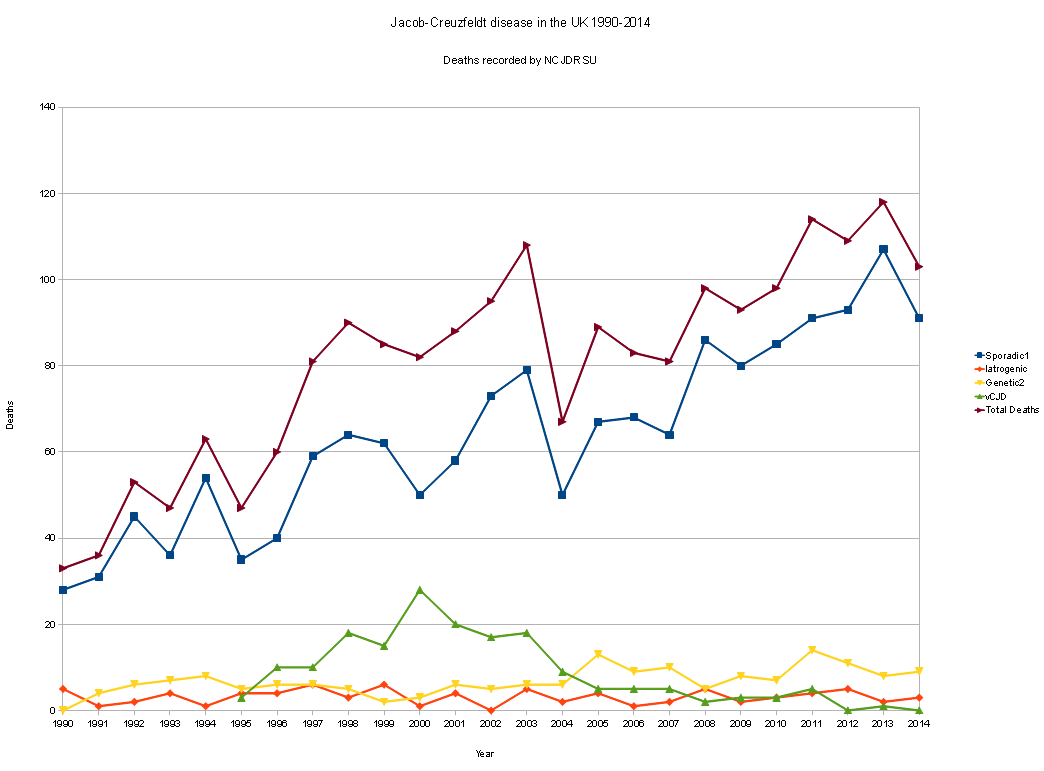
Deaths in the UK from Creutzfeldt–Jakob disease 1990–2014: while cases of vCJD have declined (green), reported cases of sporadic CJD continue to increase (blue)

The first human death from vCJD occurred in the United Kingdom; Wiltshire teenager Stephen Churchill died on 23 May 1995, aged 19. Researchers believe one in 2,000 people in the UK is a carrier of the disease, linked to eating contaminated beef. The survey provides the most robust prevalence measure to date—and identifies abnormal prion protein across a wider age group than found previously and in all genotypes, indicating "infection" may be relatively common. This new study examined over 32,000 anonymous appendix samples. Of these, 16 samples were positive for abnormal prion protein, indicating an overall prevalence of 493 per million population, or one in 2,000 people are likely to be carriers. No difference was seen in different birth cohorts (1941–1960 and 1961–1985), in both sexes, and there was no apparent difference in abnormal prion prevalence in three broad geographical areas. Genetic testing of the 16 positive samples revealed a higher proportion of valine homozygous (VV) genotype on the codon 129 of the gene encoding the prion protein (PRNP) compared with the general UK population. This also differs from the 176 people with vCJD, all of whom to date have been methionine homozygous (MM) genotype. The concern is that individuals with this VV genotype may be susceptible to developing the condition over longer incubation periods.

=== Human BSE Foundation ===
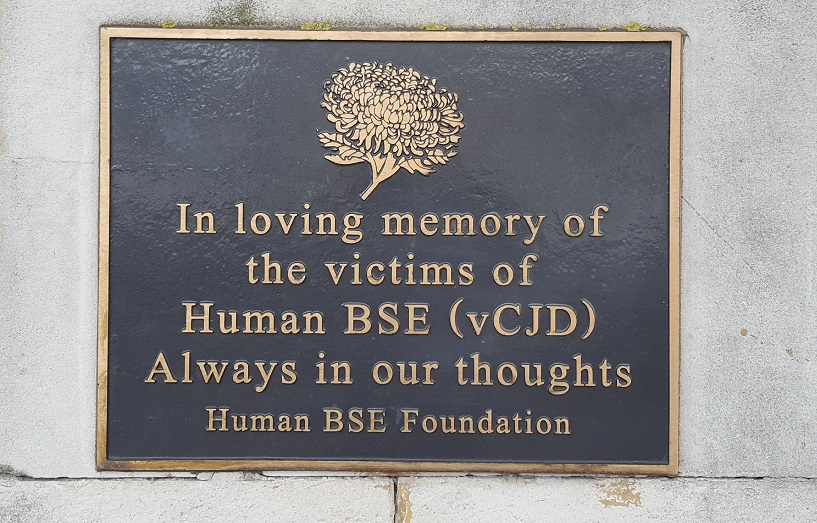
Commemorative plaque in London paying tribute to people who died from vCJD

In 2000 a voluntary support group was formed by families of people who had died from vCJD. The goal was to support other families going through a similar experience. This support was provided through a National Helpline, a Carer's Guide, a website and a network of family befriending. The support groups had an internet presence at the turn of the 21st century. The driving force behind the foundation was Lester Firkins, whose young son had died from the disease.

In October 2000 the report of the government inquiry into BSE chaired by Lord Phillips was published. The BSE report criticised former Conservative Party Agriculture Ministers John Gummer, John MacGregor and Douglas Hogg. The report concluded that the escalation of BSE into a crisis was the result of intensive farming, particularly with cows being fed with cow and sheep remains. Furthermore, the report was critical of the way the crisis had been handled. There was a reluctance to consider the possibility that BSE could cross the species barrier. The government assured the public that British beef was safe to eat, with agriculture minister John Gummer famously feeding his daughter a burger. The British government were reactive more than proactive in response; the worldwide ban on all British beef exports in March 1996 was a serious economic blow.

The foundation had been calling for compensation to include a care package to help relatives look after those with vCJD. There have been widespread complaints of inadequate health and social services support. Following the Phillips Report in October 2001, the government announced a compensation scheme for British people affected with vCJD. The multi-million-pound financial package was overseen by the vCJD Trust.

A memorial plaque for those who have died due to vCJD was installed in central London in approximately 2000. It is located on the boundary wall of St Thomas' Hospital in Lambeth facing the Riverside Walk of Albert Embankment.

== See also ==
- Jonathan Simms (1984–2011), a Northern Irish young man with vCJD who survived for 10 years after symptom onset and received experimental treatment with pentosan polysulfate, one of the longest survivals reported for the disease.
- Mepacrine, a medication shown in vitro to bind to the prion protein (PrP) and to prevent the formation of protein aggregates, but which failed to demonstrate efficacy in clinical trials for CJD conducted in the 2000s and 2010s.
