= Creutzfeldt–Jakob disease =

Neurodegenerative disease caused by prions

- Other names: subacute spongiform encephalopathy, neurocognitive disorder due to prion disease, (historical) spastic pseudosclerosis
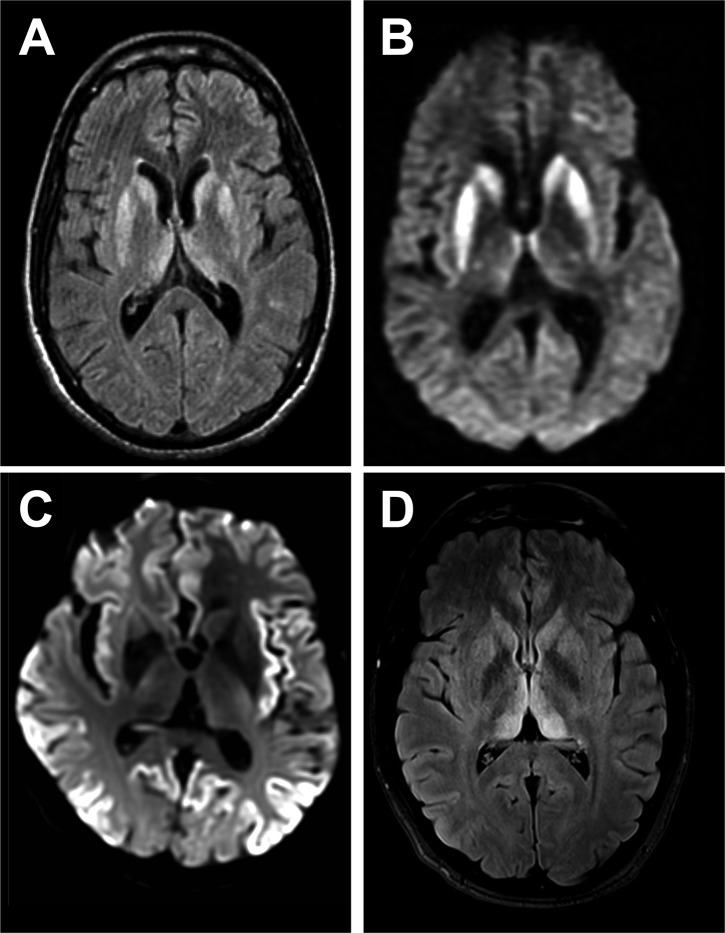
- A-B: Fluid-attenuated inversion recovery (FLAIR) imaging of the brain in sporadic CJD, showing hyperintensities in the basal ganglia. C: Diffusion-weighted imaging of sporadic CJD, showing cortical ribboning. D: Fluid-attenuated inversion recovery imaging of Variant CJD, showing hyperintensities in the thalamus (pulvinar/hockey stick sign)
- Pronunciation: UK: /ˌkrɔɪtsfɛlt ˈjækɒb/ KROYTS-felt YAK-ob, US: /- ˈjɑːkoʊb/ - YAH-kohb
- Specialty: Neurology
- Symptoms: Initial presentation is very variable, but the disease always progresses to akinetic mutism Classic CJD: Global cognitive decline (dementia), amnesia, acalculia, alexia, behavioral changes, aphasia, myoclonus, ataxia, pyramidal and extrapyramidal signs (3 to 12 months life expectancy) Pure cognitive variant: Amnesia, loss of executive functioning, aphasia, behavioral changes, resembles Alzheimer's disease (6 to 12 months life expectancy) Ataxic variant: Ataxia, pyramidal and extrapyramidal signs, most common with iatrogenic CJD, resembles kuru (6 to 12 months life expectancy) Psychiatric variant: Depression, mood changes, psychosis, delusions, hallucinations, paranoia, aggression, resembles variant CJD (6 to 12 months life expectancy) Visual/Heidenhain variant: Hemianopsia, anopsia, scotoma, palinopsia, hallucinations, cortical blindness, very rapid progression (3 to 6 months life expectancy) Thalamic variant: Insomnia, paraesthesia, autonomic failure, tachycardia, hyperhidrosis, diplopia, hypertension, stridor, anisocoria, heart issues, resembles fatal insomnia (6 to 12 months life expectancy) Stroke variant: Motor presentation, extremely rapid progression, resembles a stroke (1 to 6 months life expectancy sometimes even 2-3 weeks) Corticobasal variant: Extrapyramidal signs, resembles corticobasal syndrome (8 to 24 months)
- Complications: Aspiration pneumonia due to difficulty coughing and swallowing
- Usual onset: Around age 60
- Duration: 70% die within a year of diagnosis
- Types: Sporadic (unknown cause), Familial (genetics), Iatrogenic (acquired)
- Causes: Type 1 or type 2 PrP^{CJD}
- Risk factors: Having at least one living or deceased ancestor with the disease (in case of familial or sporadic CJD), receiving cadaveric growth hormone or dura mater (in case of iatrogenic CJD), family history of dementia, employment as a health professional, contact with cows and sheep (in case of sporadic CJD)
- Diagnostic method: Based on symptoms and medical tests after other possible causes are ruled out
- Differential diagnosis: Encephalitis, chronic meningitis, Huntington's disease, Alzheimer's disease, Sjögren's syndrome
- Prevention: Gene editing of children at risk (for fCJD), proper sterilization of surgical equipment (for iCJD)
- Treatment: Untreatable; supportive care
- Medication: Various experimental treatments, For pain relief: Morphine, Methadone
- Prognosis: 100% mortality, life expectancy varies from 3 months to multiple years
- Frequency: 1 per million per year
- Deaths: 131 in the United Kingdom (2020)

Creutzfeldt–Jakob disease (CJD) is an incurable, terminal, neurodegenerative disease belonging to the transmissible spongiform encephalopathy (TSE) group, also known as prion diseases. Early symptoms include memory problems, behavioral changes, poor coordination, visual disturbances and auditory disturbances. Later symptoms include dementia, involuntary movements, blindness, deafness, weakness, and coma. About 70% of patients die within a year of diagnosis.

The condition was first described in 1920. The name "Creutzfeldt–Jakob disease" was introduced by Walther Spielmeyer in 1922, after the German neurologists Hans Gerhard Creutzfeldt and Alfons Maria Jakob.

CJD is caused by a prion, an infectious, abnormally folded variant of a protein called the prion protein. About 85% of cases of CJD occur for unknown reasons ('sporadic CJD'), while about 10–15% of cases are inherited in an autosomal dominant manner. In rare instances, exposure to brain or spinal tissue from an infected person has resulted in transmission of disease, and a variant form of CJD was caused by exposure to meat from cows with bovine spongiform encephalopathy ("mad cow disease"). There is no evidence that sporadic CJD can spread among people via normal contact or blood transfusions, although this is possible in variant Creutzfeldt–Jakob disease.

Diagnosis of CJD involves ruling out other potential causes. An electroencephalogram, spinal tap, or magnetic resonance imaging (MRI) may support the diagnosis. Another diagnostic technique is the real-time quaking-induced conversion assay, which can detect the disease in early stages.

There is currently no specific treatment for CJD. Opioids may be used to help with pain, while clonazepam or sodium valproate may help with involuntary movements. CJD affects about one person per million people per year. Onset of sporadic CJD is typically around 60 years of age.

== Signs and symptoms ==
The first symptom of CJD is usually rapidly progressive dementia, leading to memory loss, personality changes, and hallucinations. Myoclonus (jerky movements) typically occurs in 90% of cases, but may be absent at initial onset. Other frequently occurring features include anxiety, depression, paranoia, obsessive-compulsive symptoms, and psychosis.

This is accompanied by physical problems such as speech impairment, balance and coordination dysfunction (ataxia), changes in gait, and rigid posture. In most people with CJD, these symptoms are accompanied by involuntary movements. Rarely, unusual symptoms like the alien limb phenomenon have been observed. The duration of the disease varies greatly, but sporadic (non-inherited) CJD can be fatal within months or even weeks.

Most affected people die six months after initial symptoms appear, often of pneumonia due to impaired coughing reflexes. About 15% of people with CJD survive for two or more years.

The symptoms of CJD are caused by the progressive death of the brain's nerve cells, which are associated with the build-up of abnormal prion proteins forming in the brain. When brain tissue from a person with CJD is examined under a microscope, many tiny holes can be seen where the nerve cells have died. Parts of the brain may resemble a sponge where the prions were infecting the areas of the brain.

== Cause ==
CJD is a type of transmissible spongiform encephalopathy (TSE), which is caused by prions. Prions are misfolded proteins that occur in the neurons of the central nervous system (CNS). The CJD prion is dangerous because it promotes refolding of cellular prion proteins into the diseased state.

The number of misfolded protein molecules will increase exponentially, and the process leads to a large quantity of insoluble proteins in affected cells. This mass of misfolded proteins disrupts neuronal cell function and causes cell death. Mutations in the gene for the prion protein can cause a misfolding of the dominantly alpha helical regions into beta pleated sheets. This change in conformation disables the protein's ability to undergo digestion. Once the prion is transmitted, the defective proteins invade the brain and induce other prion protein molecules to misfold in a self-sustaining feedback loop. These neurodegenerative diseases are commonly called prion diseases.

PrP^{C}, the normal fibril cellular proteins responsible for a wide range of CNS functions, are misfolded by what current research suggests are small, highly neurotoxic oligomeric aggregates, known as PrP^{Sc}, which interact with cell surfaces to disrupt neuronal function. The binding of prion oligomers to normal prion protein on neurons may trigger toxic signals similar to how oligomeric β-amyloid causes synaptic damage in Alzheimer's disease.

Different conformations of PrP^{Sc} (often termed prion "strains") are thought to cause the distinct subtypes of prion disease, explaining variations in clinical features and progression. They are thought to affect signaling processes, damaging neurons and resulting in degeneration that causes the spongiform appearance in the affected brain. Other forms of TSEs that are found in humans are Gerstmann–Sträussler–Scheinker syndrome, fatal familial insomnia, kuru, and variably protease-sensitive prionopathy. Susceptibility and disease phenotype are influenced by a common polymorphism at codon 129 of the PRNP gene (methionine/valine). Notably, individuals homozygous at codon 129 are over-represented in sporadic CJD cases and tend to have shorter incubation periods.

=== Transmission ===
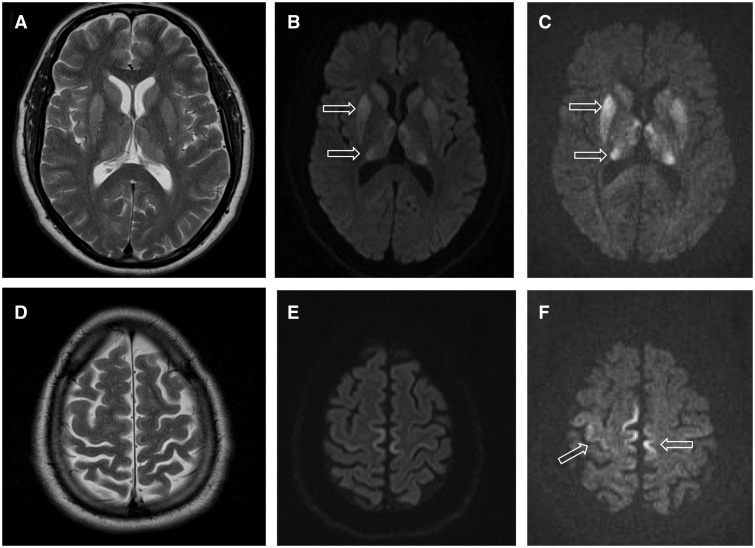
MRI of iatrogenic CJD caused by exposure years earlier to contaminated growth hormone

The defective protein can be transmitted by contaminated harvested human brain products, corneal grafts, dural grafts, or electrode implants and pituitary human growth hormone, which has been replaced by recombinant human growth hormone that poses no such risk.

It can be familial (fCJD) or it may appear without clear risk factors (sporadic form: sCJD). In the familial form, a mutation has occurred in the gene for PrP, PRNP, in that family. All types of CJD are transmissible irrespective of how they occur in the person.

It is thought that humans can contract the variant form of the disease by eating food from animals infected with bovine spongiform encephalopathy (BSE), the bovine form of TSE, also known as mad cow disease. However, it can also cause sCJD in some cases.

Cannibalism has also been implicated as a transmission mechanism for abnormal prions, causing the disease known as kuru, once found primarily among women and children of the Fore people in Papua New Guinea, who previously engaged in funerary cannibalism. While the men of the tribe ate the muscle tissue of the deceased, women and children consumed other parts, such as the brain, and were more likely than men to contract kuru from infected tissue.

Prions, the infectious agent of CJD, may not be inactivated using routine surgical instrument sterilization procedures. The World Health Organization and the US Centers for Disease Control and Prevention recommend that instrumentation used in such cases be immediately destroyed after use; short of destruction, it is recommended that heat and chemical decontamination be used in combination to process instruments that come in contact with high-infectivity tissues. Thermal depolymerization also destroys prions in infected organic and inorganic matter, since the process chemically attacks protein at the molecular level, although more effective and practical methods involve destruction by combinations of detergents and enzymes similar to biological washing powders.

=== Genetics ===
People can also develop CJD because they carry a mutation of the gene that codes for the prion protein (PRNP), located on chromosome 202p12-pter. This occurs in only 10–15% of all CJD cases. In sporadic cases, the misfolding of the prion protein is a process that is hypothesized to occur as a result of the effects of aging on cellular machinery, explaining why the disease often appears later in life. An EU study determined that "87% of cases were sporadic, 8% genetic, 5% iatrogenic and less than 1% variant."

== Diagnosis ==
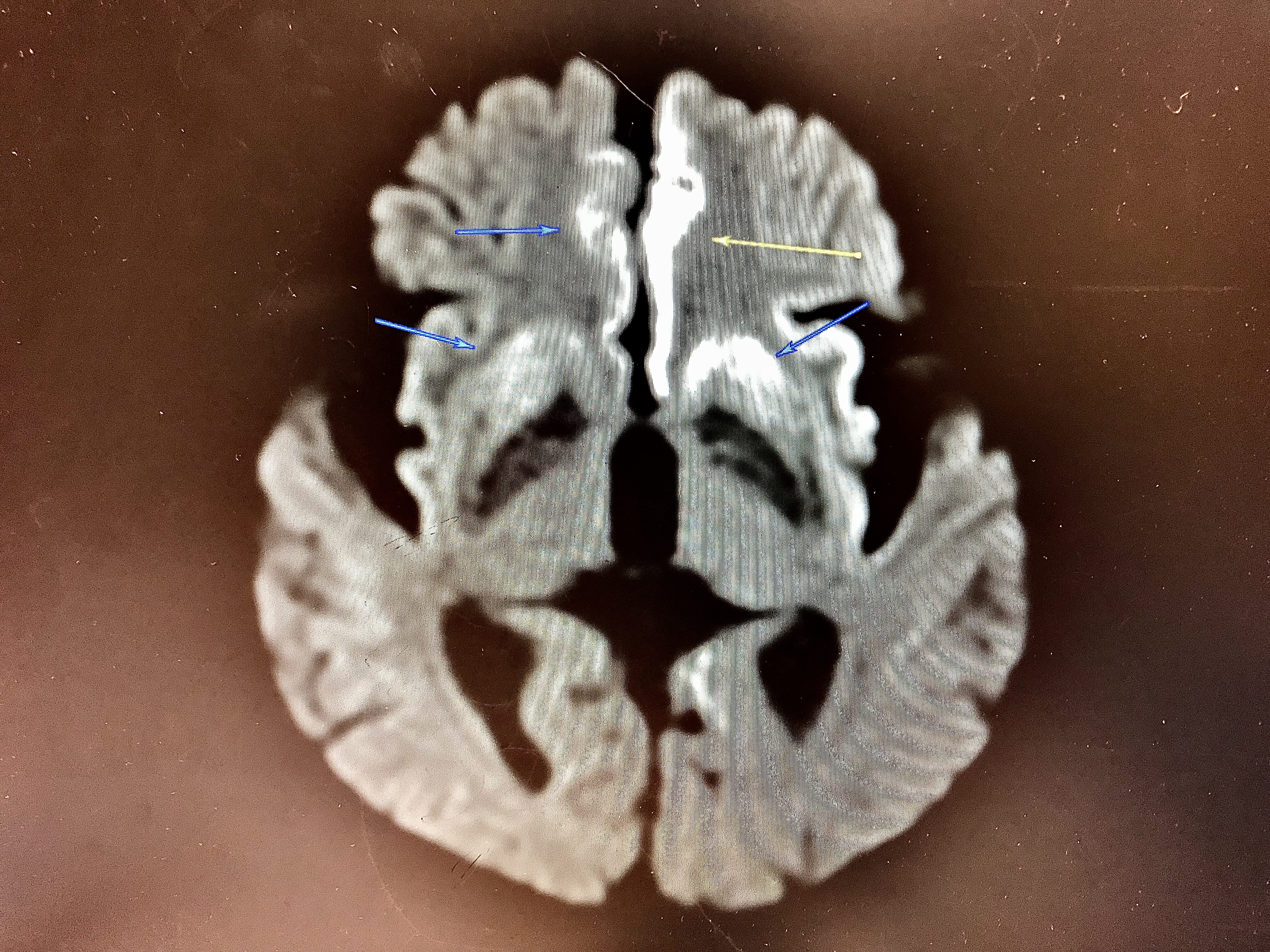
In this MRI image, brain regions affected in a case of CJD are denoted by arrows

Testing for CJD has historically been problematic, due to the nonspecific nature of early symptoms and difficulty in safely obtaining brain tissue for confirmation. The diagnosis may initially be suspected in a person with rapidly progressing dementia, particularly when it is also found with the characteristic medical signs and symptoms such as involuntary muscle jerking, difficulty with coordination/balance and walking, and visual disturbances. Further testing can support the diagnosis and may include:

- Electroencephalography – may have a characteristic generalized periodic sharp wave pattern. Periodic sharp wave complexes develop in half of the people with sporadic CJD, particularly in the later stages.
- Cerebrospinal fluid (CSF) analysis for elevated levels of 14-3-3 protein and tau protein could be supportive in the diagnosis of sCJD. The two proteins are released into the CSF by damaged nerve cells. Increased levels of tau or 14-3-3 proteins are seen in 90% of prion diseases. The markers have a specificity of 95% in clinical symptoms suggestive of CJD, but specificity is 70% in other, less characteristic cases. 14-3-3 and tau proteins may also be elevated in the CSF after ischemic strokes, inflammatory brain diseases, or seizures. The protein markers are also less specific in early CJD, genetic CJD or the bovine variant. However, a positive result should not be regarded as sufficient for the diagnosis. The real-time quaking-induced conversion (RT-QuIC) assay, which amplifies misfolded PrP^{Sc}, now plays a central role in CJD diagnosis. Second-generation RT-QuIC on cerebrospinal fluid has sensitivity in the 90–97% range and ~100% specificity in sporadic CJD, far superior to earlier CSF tests. A positive RT-QuIC (on CSF or other tissues) is now included as a criterion for probable CJD in many national surveillance centers. Studies have shown RT-QuIC can also be done on olfactory mucosa swabs obtained via nasal brushing and on skin biopsies, with high diagnostic accuracy (reported sensitivities ~90–100%).
- MRI with diffusion weighted inversion (DWI) and fluid-attenuated inversion recovery (FLAIR) shows a high signal intensity in certain parts of the cortex (a cortical ribboning appearance), the basal ganglia, and the thalami. The most common presenting patterns are simultaneous involvement of the cortex and striatum (60% of cases), cortical involvement without the striatum (30%), thalamus (21%), cerebellum (8%) and striatum without cortical involvement (7%). In populations with a rapidly progressive dementia (early in the disease process), MRI has a sensitivity of 91% and specificity of 97% for diagnosing CJD. The MRI changes characteristic of CJD may also be seen in the immediate aftermath (hours after the event) of autoimmune encephalitis or focal seizures.

In recent years, studies have shown that the tumour marker neuron-specific enolase (NSE) is often elevated in CJD cases; however, its diagnostic utility is seen primarily when combined with a test for the 14-3-3 protein. As of 2010, screening tests to identify infected asymptomatic individuals, such as blood donors, are not yet available, though methods have been proposed and evaluated.

=== Imaging ===
Imaging of the brain may be performed during medical evaluation, both to rule out other causes and to obtain supportive evidence for diagnosis. Imaging findings are variable in their appearance and also variable in sensitivity and specificity. While imaging plays a lesser role in diagnosis of CJD, characteristic findings on brain MRI in some cases may precede onset of clinical manifestations.

Brain MRI is the most useful imaging modality for changes related to CJD. Of the MRI sequences, diffuse-weighted imaging sequences are most sensitive. Characteristic findings are as follows:

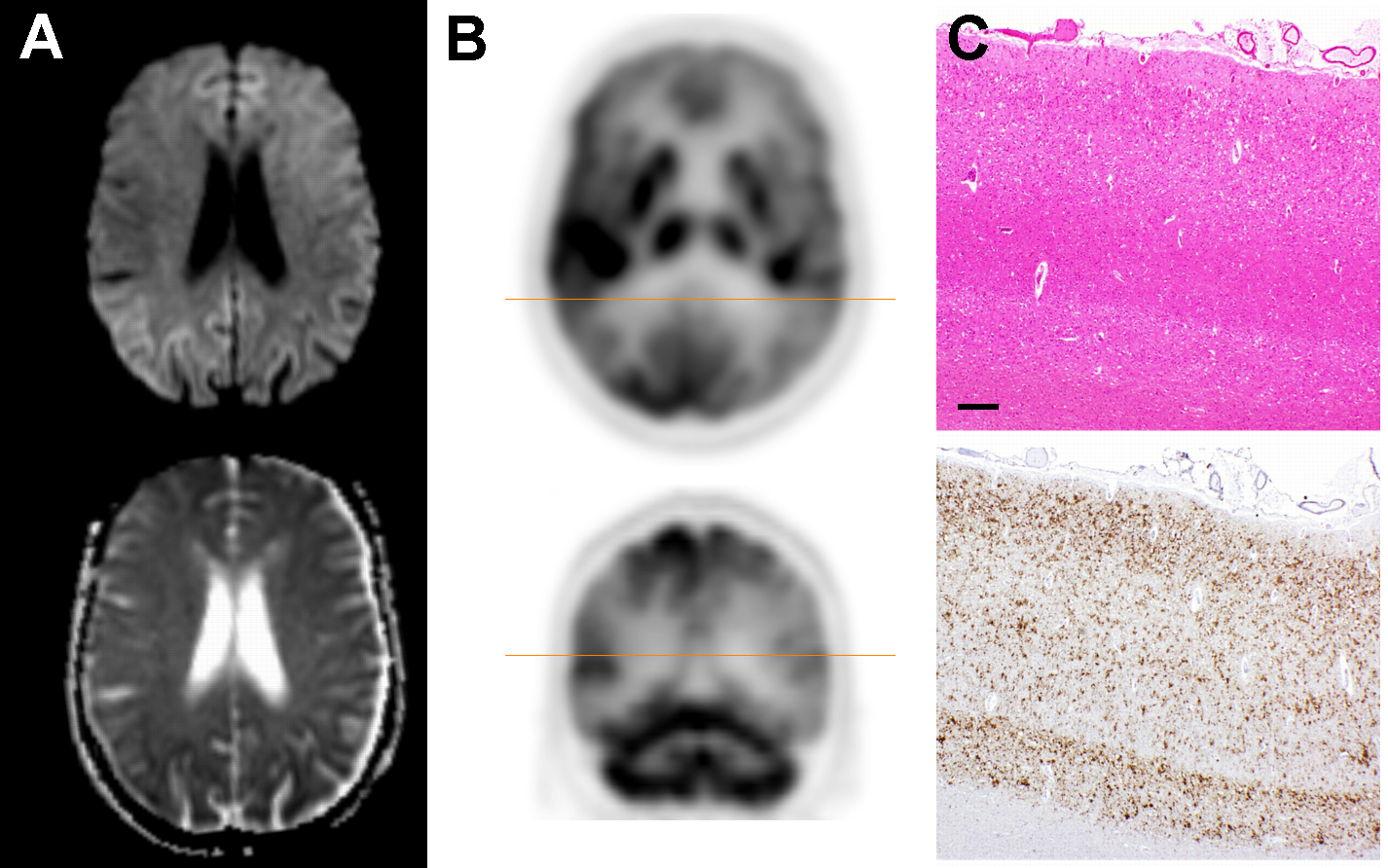
dwMRI, FDG PET and post mortem histology from a patient who presented with sCJD aged 66

- Focal or diffuse diffusion-restriction involving the cerebral cortex or basal ganglia. The most characteristic and striking cortical abnormality has been called "cortical ribboning" or "cortical ribbon sign" due to hyperintensities resembling ribbons appearing in the cortex on MRI. The involvement of the thalamus can be found in sCJD, is even stronger and constant in vCJD.
- Varying degree of symmetric T2 hyperintense signal changes in the basal ganglia (i.e., caudate and putamen), and to a lesser extent globus pallidus and occipital cortex.

Brain FDG PET-CT tends to be markedly abnormal, and is increasingly used in the investigation of dementias.

- Patients with CJD will normally have hypometabolism on FDG PET.

=== Histopathology ===
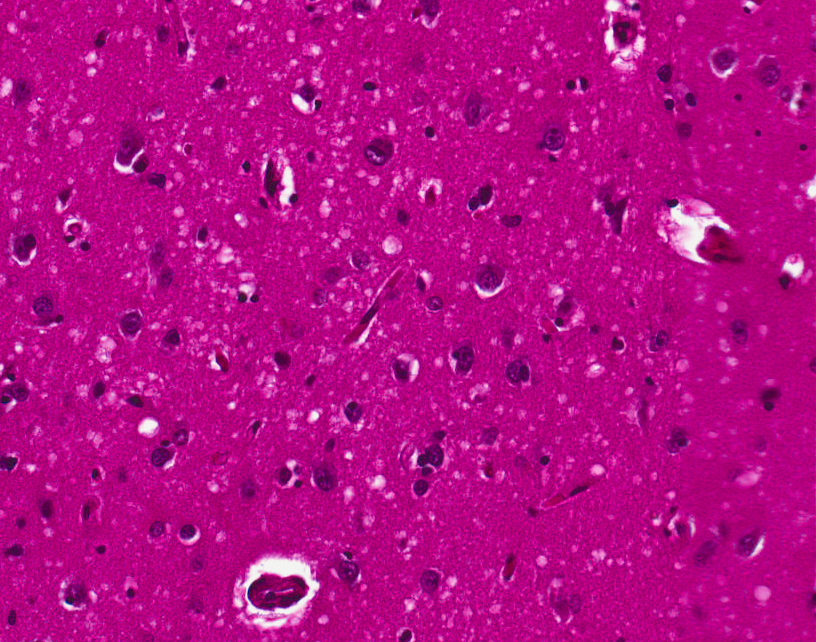
Spongiform change in CJD

Testing of tissue remains the most definitive way of confirming the diagnosis of CJD, although even a biopsy is not always conclusive.

In one-third of people with sporadic CJD, deposits of "prion protein (scrapie)", PrP^{Sc}, can be found in the skeletal muscle or the spleen. Diagnosis of vCJD can be supported by biopsy of the tonsils, which harbor significant amounts of PrP^{Sc}; however, biopsy of brain tissue is the definitive diagnostic test for all other forms of prion disease. Due to its invasiveness, a biopsy will not be done if clinical suspicion is sufficiently high or low. A negative biopsy does not rule out CJD, since it may predominate in a specific part of the brain.

The classic histologic appearance is spongiform change in the gray matter: the presence of many round vacuoles from one to 50 micrometers in the neuropil, in all six cortical layers in the cerebral cortex, or with diffuse involvement of the cerebellar molecular layer. These vacuoles appear glassy or eosinophilic and may coalesce. Neuronal loss and gliosis are also seen. Plaques of amyloid-like material can be seen in the neocortex in some cases of CJD.

However, extra-neuronal vacuolization can also be seen in other disease states. Diffuse cortical vacuolization occurs in Alzheimer's disease, and superficial cortical vacuolization occurs in ischemia and frontotemporal dementia. These vacuoles appear clear and punched out. Larger vacuoles encircling neurons, vessels, and glia are a possible processing artifact.

=== Classification ===
Types of CJD include:

- Sporadic (sCJD), caused by the spontaneous misfolding of the prion protein in an individual. This accounts for 85% of cases of CJD. Sporadic CJD can be further sub-classified by molecular profile into subtypes (MM1, MV2, etc.), which correlate with certain clinical-pathologic features.
  - MM1 / MV1 Subtype:
    - Clinical Features: Accounts for approximately 75% of sCJD cases. Characterized by rapidly progressive dementia, myoclonus, and typical EEG findings.
    - Neuropathology: Synaptic-type PrP^{Sc} deposition predominantly in the cerebral cortex. Spongiform changes are widespread, with significant neuronal loss and gliosis.
  - MM2 Subtype:
    - MM2C (Cortical): Presents with a more prolonged disease course and prominent cortical involvement. Neuropathology reveals PrP^{Sc} deposits in the cortex with less spongiform change compared to MM1.
    - MM2T (Thalamic): Rare; characterized by predominant thalamic involvement, leading to sleep disturbances and autonomic dysfunction. Neuropathology shows significant PrP^{Sc} deposition and neuronal loss in the thalamus.
  - VV1 Subtype:
    - Clinical Features: Rare; presents at a younger age with a slower disease progression.
    - Neuropathology: Predominant cortical involvement with synaptic-type PrP^{Sc} deposition.
  - VV2 Subtype:
    - Clinical Features: Second most common subtype. Patients often present with ataxia and other cerebellar signs.
    - Neuropathology: Significant PrP^{Sc} deposition in the cerebellum and basal ganglia, with prominent spongiform changes and neuronal loss.
- Familial (fCJD), caused by an inherited mutation in the prion-protein gene. This accounts for the majority of the other 15% of cases of CJD.
- Acquired CJD, caused by contamination with tissue from an infected person, usually as the result of a medical procedure (iatrogenic CJD). Medical procedures that are associated with the spread of this form of CJD include blood transfusion from the infected person, use of human-derived pituitary growth hormones, gonadotropin hormone therapy, and corneal and meningeal transplants. Variant Creutzfeldt–Jakob disease (vCJD) is a type of acquired CJD potentially acquired from bovine spongiform encephalopathy or caused by consuming food contaminated with prions. Sporadic CJD, while transmissible through tissue transplants, may not be transmitted through blood transfusion.

Clinical and pathologic characteristics
| Characteristic | Classic CJD | Variant CJD |
|---|---|---|
| Median age at death | 68 years | 28 years |
| Median duration of illness | 4–5 months | 13–14 months |
| Clinical signs and symptoms | Dementia; early neurologic signs | Prominent psychiatric/behavioral symptoms; painful dysesthesias; delayed neurologic signs |
| Periodic sharp waves on electroencephalogram | Often present | Often absent |
| Signal hyperintensity in the caudate nucleus and putamen on diffusion-weighted and FLAIR MRI | Often present | Often absent |
| Pulvinar sign-bilateral high signal intensities on axial FLAIR MRI. Also, posterior thalamic involvement on sagittal T2 sequences | Not reported | Present in >75% of cases |
| Immunohistochemical analysis of brain tissue | Variable accumulation. | Marked accumulation of protease-resistant prion protein |
| Presence of agent in lymphoid tissue | Not readily detected | Readily detected |
| Increased glycoform ratio on immunoblot analysis of protease-resistant prion protein | Not reported | Marked accumulation of protease-resistant prion protein |
| Presence of amyloid plaques in brain tissue | May be present | May be present |

== Treatment ==
As of 2026, there is no cure or effective treatment for CJD. Some of the symptoms, like twitching, can be managed, but otherwise treatment is palliative care. Psychiatric symptoms like anxiety and depression can be treated with sedatives and antidepressants. Myoclonic jerks can be handled with clonazepam or sodium valproate. Opiates can help with pain. Seizures are very uncommon but can nevertheless be treated with antiepileptic drugs.

In 2022, results of an early-stage trial of PRN100, a monoclonal antibody against PrP, were reported: the drug appeared safe and reached the brain, but treated patients did not show clearly improved survival compared to historical controls. While not curative, this trial demonstrated the feasibility of immunotherapy for prion disease.

In 2025, preclinical research demonstrated that oral, low-dose treatment with the antiretroviral medication efavirenz extended survival and slowed disease progression in a humanized mouse model of sporadic CJD (sCJD). The drug acts as an allosteric activator of the brain-specific cholesterol-metabolizing enzyme CYP46A1. This mechanism promotes brain cholesterol turnover, reduces the neurotoxic accumulation of pathological prion proteins (PrPSc), and alleviates metabolic lipid alterations in the brain.

== Prognosis ==
Life expectancy is greatly reduced for people with Creutzfeldt–Jakob disease, and the average is less than six months. As of 1981, no one was known to have lived longer than 2.5 years after the onset of CJD symptoms. One of the world's longest survivors of vCJD was Jonathan Simms, a Northern Irish man who lived for 10 years after his diagnosis and received experimental treatment with pentosan polysulfate. Simms died in 2011.

== Epidemiology ==
The CDC monitors the occurrence of CJD in the United States through periodic reviews of national mortality data. According to the CDC:

- CJD occurs worldwide at roughly 1–1.5 cases per million people per year. Recent surveillance reports indicate a slight increase in recorded incidence in many countries over time. For example, a study made in 2020 noted that sporadic CJD incidence in the U.K. rose from 1990 to 2018, and several other countries also reported increases in CJD cases in the 2000s.
- On the basis of mortality surveillance from 1979 to 1994, the annual incidence of CJD remained stable at approximately 1 case per million people in the United States.
- In the United States, CJD deaths among people younger than 30 years of age are extremely rare (fewer than five deaths per billion per year).
- The disease is found most frequently in people 55–65 years of age, but cases can occur in people older than 90 years and younger than 55 years of age.
- In more than 85% of cases, the duration of CJD is less than one year (median: four months) after the onset of symptoms.

Further information from the CDC:

- Risk of developing CJD increases with age.
- CJD incidence was 3.5 cases per million among those over 50 years of age between 1979 and 2017.
- Approximately 85% of CJD cases are sporadic, and 10–15% of CJD cases are due to inherited mutations of the prion protein gene.
- CJD deaths and age-adjusted death rate in the United States indicate an increasing trend in the number of deaths between 1979 and 2017.

Although not fully understood, additional information suggests that CJD rates in nonwhite groups are lower than in whites. While the mean onset is approximately 67 years of age, cases of sCJD have been reported as young as 17 years and over 80 years of age. Mental capabilities rapidly deteriorate and the average amount of time from onset of symptoms to death is 7 to 9 months.

According to a 2020 systematic review on the international epidemiology of CJD:

- Surveillance studies from 2005 and later show the estimated global incidence is 1–2 cases per million population per year.
- Sporadic CJD (sCJD) incidence increased from the years 1990–2018 in the UK.
- Probable or definite sCJD deaths also increased from the years 1996–2018 in twelve additional countries.
- CJD incidence is greatest in those over the age of 55 years old, with an average age of 67 years old.

The intensity of CJD surveillance increases the number of reported cases, often in countries where CJD epidemics have occurred in the past and where surveillance resources are greatest. An increase in surveillance and reporting of CJD is most likely in response to BSE and vCJD. Possible factors contributing to an increase in CJD incidence are an aging population, population increase, clinician awareness, and more accurate diagnostic methods. Since CJD symptoms are similar to other neurological conditions, it is also possible that CJD is mistaken for stroke, acute nephropathy, general dementia, and hyperparathyroidism.

== History ==
The disease was first described by German neurologist Hans Gerhard Creutzfeldt in 1920 and shortly afterward by Alfons Maria Jakob, giving it the name Creutzfeldt–Jakob disease. Some of the clinical findings described in their first papers do not match current criteria for Creutzfeldt–Jakob disease, and it has been speculated that at least two of the people in the initial studies had a different illness. An early description of familial CJD stems from the German psychiatrist and neurologist Friedrich Meggendorfer (1880–1953). A study published in 1997 counted more than 100 cases worldwide of transmissible CJD and new cases continued to appear at the time.

The first report of suspected iatrogenic CJD was published in 1974. Animal experiments showed that corneas of infected animals could transmit CJD, and the causative agent spreads along visual pathways. A second case of CJD associated with a corneal transplant was reported without details.

In 1977, CJD transmission caused by silver electrodes previously used in the brain of a person with CJD was first reported. Transmission occurred despite the decontamination of the electrodes with ethanol and formaldehyde. Retrospective studies identified four other cases likely of a similar cause. The rate of transmission from a single contaminated instrument is unknown, although it is not 100%. In some cases, the exposure occurred weeks after the instruments were used on a person with CJD.

In the 1980s, it was discovered that Lyodura, a dura mater transplant product, was shown to transmit CJD from the donor to the recipient. This led to the product being banned in Canada, but it was used in other countries such as Japan until 1993. A review article published in 1979 indicated that 25 dura mater cases had occurred by that date in Australia, Canada, Germany, Italy, Japan, New Zealand, Spain, the United Kingdom, and the United States.

By 1985, a series of case reports in the United States showed that when injected, cadaver-extracted pituitary human growth hormone could transmit CJD to humans.

In 1992, it was recognized that human gonadotropin administered by injection could also transmit CJD from person to person.

Stanley B. Prusiner of the University of California, San Francisco (UCSF) was awarded the Nobel Prize in Physiology or Medicine in 1997 "for his discovery of Prions—a new biological principle of infection".

Yale University neuropathologist Laura Manuelidis has challenged the prion protein (PrP) explanation for the disease. In January 2007, she and her colleagues reported that they had found a virus-like particle in naturally and experimentally infected animals. "The high infectivity of comparable, isolated virus-like particles that show no intrinsic PrP by antibody labeling, combined with their loss of infectivity when nucleic acid–protein complexes are disrupted, make it likely that these 25-nm particles are the causal TSE virions".

=== Australia ===
Australia has documented 10 cases of healthcare-acquired CJD (iatrogenic or ICJD). Five of the deaths resulted after the patients, who were in treatment either for infertility or short stature, were treated using contaminated pituitary extract hormone but no new cases have been noted since 1991. The other five deaths occurred due to dura mater grafting procedures that were performed during brain surgery, in which the covering of the brain is repaired. There have been no other ICJD deaths documented in Australia due to transmission during healthcare procedures.

=== Brazil ===
Between 2005 and 2021, Brazil had 1,576 suspected cases of CJD, of which 547 were confirmed. In August 2026, Brazilian aviation expert Lito Sousa was diagnosed with CJD. He died 41 days later, on October 1.

=== New Zealand ===
A case was reported in 1989 in a 25-year-old man from New Zealand, who also received dura mater transplant. Five New Zealanders have been confirmed to have died of the sporadic form of Creutzfeldt–Jakob disease (CJD) in 2012.

=== United States ===
In 1988, there was a confirmed death from CJD of a person from Manchester, New Hampshire. Massachusetts General Hospital believed the person acquired the disease from a surgical instrument at a podiatrist's office.

In 2007, Michael Homer, former Vice President of Netscape, had been experiencing consistent memory problems, which led to his diagnosis. In August 2013 the British journalist Graham Usher died in New York of CJD.

In September 2013, another person in Manchester was posthumously determined to have died of the disease. The person had undergone brain surgery at Catholic Medical Center three months before his death, and a surgical probe used in the procedure was subsequently reused in other operations. Public health officials identified thirteen people at three hospitals who may have been exposed to the disease through the contaminated probe but said the risk of anyone contracting CJD is "extremely low".

In January 2015, former speaker of the Utah House of Representatives Rebecca D. Lockhart died of the disease within a few weeks of diagnosis.

John Carroll, former editor of The Baltimore Sun and Los Angeles Times, died of CJD in Kentucky in June 2015, after having been diagnosed in January.

American actress Barbara Tarbuck (General Hospital, American Horror Story) died of the disease on December 26, 2016.

José Baselga, clinical oncologist having headed the AstraZeneca oncology division, died in Cerdanya, March 21, 2021, from CJD.

In April 2024, a report was published regarding two hunters from the same lodge who, in 2022, were found to be afflicted with sporadic CJD after eating deer meat infected with chronic wasting disease (CWD), suggesting a potential link between CWD and CJD.

== Research ==
=== Diagnosis ===
- In 2010, a team from New York described detection of PrP^{Sc} in sheep's blood, even when initially present at only one part in one hundred billion (10^{−11}) in sheep's brain tissue. The method combines amplification with a novel technology called surround optical fiber immunoassay (SOFIA) and some specific antibodies against PrP^{Sc}. The technique allowed improved detection and testing time for PrP^{Sc}.
- In 2014, a human study showed a nasal brushing method that can accurately detect PrP in the olfactory epithelial cells of people with CJD.

=== Treatment ===
- Pentosan polysulfate (PPS) may slow the progression of the disease, and may have contributed to the longer than expected survival of the seven people studied. The CJD Therapy Advisory Group to the UK Health Departments advises that data are not sufficient to support claims that pentosan polysulfate is an effective treatment and suggests that further research in animal models is appropriate. A 2007 review of the treatment of 26 people with PPS finds no proof of efficacy because of the lack of accepted objective criteria, but it was unclear to the authors whether that was caused by PPS itself. In 2012 it was claimed that the lack of significant benefits has likely been caused because of the drug being administered very late in the disease in many patients.
- Use of RNA interference to slow the progression of scrapie has been studied in mice. The RNA blocks the production of the protein that the CJD process transforms into prions.
- Both amphotericin B and doxorubicin have been investigated as treatments for CJD, but as yet there is no strong evidence that either drug is effective in stopping the disease. Further study has been conducted with other medical drugs, but none are effective. However, anticonvulsants and anxiolytic agents, such as valproate or a benzodiazepine, may be administered to relieve associated symptoms.
- Quinacrine, a medicine originally created for malaria, has been evaluated as a treatment for CJD. The efficacy of quinacrine was assessed in a rigorous clinical trial in the UK and the results were published in Lancet Neurology, and concluded that quinacrine had no measurable effect on the clinical course of CJD.
- Astemizole, a medication approved for human use, has been found to have anti-prion activity and may lead to a treatment for Creutzfeldt–Jakob disease.
- A monoclonal antibody (code name PRN100) targeting the prion protein (PrP) was given to six people with Creutzfeldt–Jakob disease in an early-stage clinical trial conducted from 2018 to 2022. The treatment appeared to be well-tolerated and was able to access the brain, where it might have helped to clear PrP^{C}. While the treated patients still showed progressive neurological decline, and while none of them survived longer than expected from the normal course of the disease, the scientists at University College London who conducted the study see these early-stage results as encouraging and suggest conducting a larger study, ideally at the earliest possible intervention.

== See also ==
- Transmissible spongiform encephalopathy
- Chronic wasting disease
- Kuru
