= Lito Sousa =

Brazilian YouTuber and aviation specialist (1967–2026)

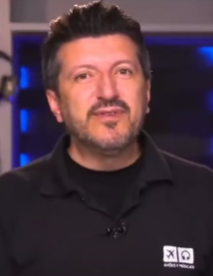
- Lito in 2022
- Born: Joselito Geraldo de Sousa; 25 January 1967; Natal, Rio Grande do Norte, Brazil
- Died: 1 October 2026 (aged 59); São Paulo, Brazil
- Occupations: YouTuber; pilot; mechanical engineer
- Spouse: Mila Seidl (m. 2016)
- Children: 1

YouTube information
- Channel: Aviões e Músicas
- Years active: 2010–2026
- Genre: aviation
- Subscribers: 4.2 million
- Views: 1.3 billion
- Last updated: 1 October 2026
- Website: avioesemusicas.com

Joselito Geraldo de Sousa (25 January 1967 – 1 October 2026), known as Lito Sousa, was a Brazilian aviation specialist known for his YouTube channel, Aviões e Músicas. Lito was a pilot, aircraft mechanic, and aviation safety specialist who worked as a mechanic and flight supervisor for major airlines such as Varig, Transbrasil, and United Airlines.

== Career ==
Lito began his career in a technical training program with Brazilian Air Force (FAB). His channel, "Aviões e Músicas" (Airplanes and Songs), is the most-watched aviation channel on YouTube, where he posted videos "demystifying the mysteries of aviation." In 2021, he became a pilot after obtaining his pilot's license. His journey was chronicled in the series Decola Lito.

=== Sem Medo de Voar ===
In 2022, Lito Sousa launched the online course "Sem Medo de Voar" (No Fear of Flying), aimed at people who suffer from aerophobia. The course covers topics such as how aircraft work, turbulence, noise, flight safety, and psychological factors. The content is also shared on his YouTube channel.

== Personal life ==
Lito was born on 25 January 1967. He married Mila Seidl in 2016, and they had a son. As the creator of the YouTube channel "Aviões e Músicas," he had over 4.2 million subscribers. He was the author of the book Onde Morrem os Aviões and also founded Lito Academy and the course "Sem Medo de Voar."

=== Health and death ===
In July 2026, Lito publicly announced his diagnosis of intermediate-aggressiveness prostate adenocarcinoma, identified after an abnormal result on a prostate-specific antigen (PSA) test during a routine checkup. His cancer treatment took a back seat when he developed neurological symptoms (numbness and loss of movement in his left arm), initially treated as encephalitis or inflammation of the central nervous system. He was admitted to Hospital Israelita Albert Einstein in São Paulo, underwent pulse therapy and other procedures, and was discharged at the end of July, but his neurological condition took a turn for the worse.

On 21 August 2026, his wife revealed in a video posted on social media that further tests had confirmed a diagnosis of Creutzfeldt–Jakob disease (CJD). According to her, in the preceding weeks, Lito had already lost a significant portion of his motor function, although he remained lucid; the family was setting up a home care arrangement, and Lito himself planned to record a video explaining the situation. CJD typically progresses rapidly, with a life expectancy of less than one year after the onset of symptoms. As a prion disease, CJD is always fatal. On 23 August, he made his first public appearance following the announcement of his diagnosis and asked in English to undergo an experimental treatment currently being developed by Harvard researchers.

On 11 September, after authorization from Anvisa, Lito obtained access to the substance ALN-6457, an experimental drug against the disease that had only been tested on animals until then. Lito died due to complications from the illness on 1 October, at the age of 59. The announcement was made by his wife in an Instagram post. His body was laid in state on 2 October, in Prefeitura de Aeronáutica de São Paulo, to the public from 9 a.m. to 12 p.m., with restrictions for his family and close friends.

== Honors ==
In 2021, Lito was honored by the Aeronautical Accidents Investigation and Prevention Center (CENIPA) with the "SIPAER 2021 Award," which is given to individuals in the industry "who promote aviation culture, flight safety, and the philosophy of the Aviation Accident Investigation and Prevention System (SIPAER)."
