= Real-time quaking-induced conversion =

Highly sensitive assay for prion detection

Real-time quaking-induced conversion (RT-QuIC) is a highly sensitive assay for prion detection. It is nearly 100% specific for the diagnosis of Creutzfeldt-Jakob disease.

== Technique ==
The "quaking" in the name of the technique refers to the fact that samples in the RT-QuIC assay are literally subjected to shaking. This action breaks apart aggregates of prion protein (PrP) that are then further incubated, amplifying the amount of misfolded PrP to detectable levels.

It is "an early, rapid and specific assay for prion diseases". It can sample multiple sample types, such as cerebrospinal fluid (CSF), brain, lymph nodes, blood, muscle, and skin, and so it is applicable to scrapie in sheep, chronic wasting disease (CWD) in cervids, bovine spongiform encephalopathy (BSE) in cows and sporadic Creutzfeldt–Jakob disease in humans, amongst others.

The RT-QuIC assay uses in excess recombinantly produced normally folded prions, often a truncated Syrian Hamster protein, amino acids 90-231. Samples suspected of containing misfolded prions are added, leading to misfolding and aggregation of normally folded prion protein. These protein aggregates can be detected by thioflavin T visible spectrum fluorescence detection. The Centers for Disease Control and Prevention includes a positive RT-QuIC result in its diagnostic criteria for the probable diagnosis of sCJD.

RT-QuIC assays can also be used to test for scrapie, BSE, and CWD. Various procedures can improve sensitivity and specificity. Iron oxide metal extraction (IOME) uses the natural metal affinity of the prion protein; a sample is incubated with magnetic beads, which bind to the prion protein. The prion-rich bead fraction is subsequently harvested and tested.

Commonly tested tissues are brain homogenates and lymph tissues; however, prions have also been detected in skin and blood samples. Certain tissues can be difficult to test for prions. For example, blood samples tend to have low levels of circulating intracellular prions and have inhibitors of the assay.

== See also ==
- Protein misfolding cyclic amplification
- Western blot
