= Jonathan Simms =

Northern Irish medical patient (1984-2011)

- Born: 1 June 1984; Belfast, Northern Ireland
- Died: 5 March 2011 (aged 26); Belfast, Northern Ireland
- Other name: Jonny
- Known for: Experimental treatment for vCJD
- Parents: Don Simms; Karen Simms

Jonathan Simms (1 June 1984 – 5 March 2011) was a man from Belfast, Northern Ireland, who contracted variant Creutzfeldt–Jakob disease (vCJD) in his late teenage years. He was given a post-diagnosis life expectancy of one year, similar to that of other young people who were diagnosed in the same age bracket. However, due to his receiving experimental treatment for the disease (of pentosan polysulfate), he lived for another ten years after diagnosis, although his higher functions were severely limited.

== Life and diagnosis ==
Simms was born in Belfast on 1 June 1984. At the time of his diagnosis, he was an athletic teenager who excelled at football and had undergone trials with the Northern Ireland international squad. He initially displayed symptoms between May and September 2001 of a disease which was consistent with either multiple sclerosis (MS) or vCJD. The doctor who first examined him, Dr. Mark McClean, later said: "It was either multiple sclerosis or variant CJD; I told them that I thought it was MS, because I hoped to God that's what it was." From diagnosis to death (depending on a varying number of circumstances), patients with vCJD are given a life expectancy of between six months and two years. Simms was given a year to live; two years after diagnosis, however, he became the first person with vCJD to be treated with an experimental drug that was known to slow the onset of similar diseases in animals. (Note: In another case, Rachel Forber, a 21-year old woman from Liverpool, had been given quinacrine to see if this would slow the effects of the disease. Quinacrine had been previously used on humans, but for other diseases such as malaria. At the start of her treatment she was bed-ridden, but within three months she was able to walk and swim unaided. However, the treatment had a profound side effect on her liver and the drug was withdrawn. Forber died of vCJD at the end of 2001.)

== Treatment ==
In December 2002, Simms' parents won a legal battle in the High Court of Justice of England and Wales for their son to receive an experimental drug (Note: The drug had already been used to relieve cystitis and bladder pain, but in this instance was untested on humans via a direct route into the brain) called pentosan polysulphate (PPS). The legal challenge centred around the fact that whilst the drug had been shown to decelerate the onset of the disease in animals, it had not been tested on humans. Eventually, Dame Butler-Sloss ruled in the family's favor stating:

Where there is no alternative treatment available and the disease is progressive and fatal, it seems to me to be reasonable to consider experimental treatment with unknown benefits and risks, but without significant risks of increased suffering to the patient, in cases where there is some benefit to the patient.

The medical community's objection to the use of the drug was that it has traditionally been indicated for its anti-coagulant and anti-inflammatory properties, which meant using it in high doses on Simms ran the risk of haemorrhage. This was also clouded by the fact that an effective dose and lethal dose were very close to each other when tested on animals, so there was an inherent risk of killing Simms just by administering the drug. The family were forced to go back to court when the English ruling was found to have no validity in Northern Ireland, but in January 2003, the High Court in Northern Ireland ruled in favor of the treatment.

Whilst the High Court ruling allowed the administering of the drug, the NHS was not legally bound to be the framework by which it was given to Simms. After the ruling, a neurosurgeon was found who would undertake the procedure(s), but the NHS trust that he worked for would not allow it. Because the molecules of PPS are so large, there was no way that an intravenous or oral treatment would work as the drug would not be able to cross the blood–brain barrier. Eventually a method of delivery was established with a shunt that went up his body from his abdomen directly into his brain. Injections were then administered via this shunt straight to Simms' brain.

By September 2003, it was reported by Simms' primary care team that he had regained the ability to swallow, his body weight had stabilized and returned to normal and that his anxiety levels had decreased. His family were critical that when they first wanted to apply the drug in March 2002, Simms was able to walk and talk for himself. By the time the case had been heard by the courts system, 8 months had elapsed and Simms' condition had deteriorated.

In 2007, the treatment appeared to have stabilized Simms and it was announced that he was no longer terminally ill (although as far back as December 2004 the Marie Curie hospice he was due to stay in stated that he no longer fit their criteria for terminal illness). Don Simms (Jonathan's father) said that his son was aware of his surroundings and sometimes "made attempts at vocalization, and on occasion, we can make out the words". By 2004, PPS had been administered to 12 other people who had vCJD. One died, five continued to deteriorate and the condition of six patients appeared to have stabilized.

== Death ==
In the later stages of his illness, Simms needed intensive care. He was cared for by his family at their home in the Highfield Estate of West Belfast. Simms died on 5 March 2011, almost ten years after his first diagnosis. He was buried on 10 March 2011 at Carnmoney Cemetery just outside north Belfast.
