= Chronic wasting disease =

Prion disease affecting the deer family

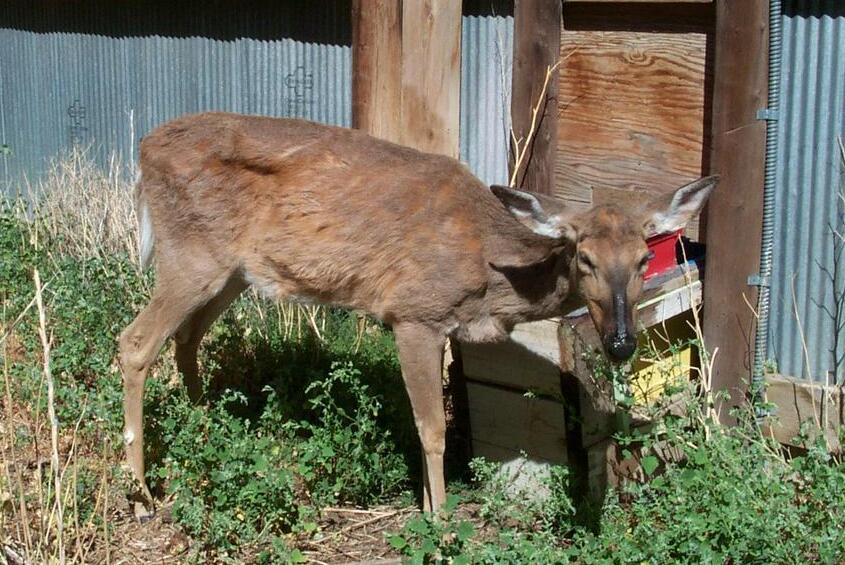
- Deer with signs of chronic wasting disease
- Specialty: Infectious disease, neurology, veterinary medicine
- Symptoms: Behavioral changes, weight loss, decreased interactions with other animals, tremors, repetitive walking in set patterns, increased drinking and urination, excessive salivation and grinding of the teeth, loss of fear of humans, confusion
- Usual onset: 18–24 months after initial exposure
- Causes: A type of prion
- Diagnostic method: Suspected based on symptoms, confirmed by examination of the brain
- Prevention: Exterminating infected deer, incineration and disposal of infected deer carcasses
- Treatment: None
- Prognosis: Always fatal

Chronic wasting disease (CWD), is a transmissible spongiform encephalopathy (TSE) naturally affecting members of the deer family. TSEs are a family of diseases caused by misfolded proteins called prions and include similar diseases such as mad cow disease in cattle, Creutzfeldt–Jakob disease in humans, and scrapie in sheep. In the United States, CWD affects mule deer, white-tailed deer, red deer, sika deer, elk, caribou, and moose. The transmission of CWD to other species such as squirrel monkeys and humanized mice has been observed in experimental settings.

In 1967, CWD was first identified in mule deer at a government research facility in northern Colorado, United States. It was initially recognized as a clinical "wasting" syndrome and then in 1978, it was identified more specifically as a TSE disease. Since then, CWD has been found in free-ranging and captive animal populations in 33 US states and five Canadian provinces.

In addition, CWD has been found in one Minnesota red deer farm, one wild reindeer herd in Norway (March 2016) as well as in wild moose. Single cases of CWD in moose have been found in Finland (March 2018) and in Sweden (March and May 2019, September 2020). CWD was found in South Korea in some deer imported from Canada. CWD is typified by chronic weight loss and clinical signs compatible with brain lesions, aggravated over time, always leading to death.

Although reports in the popular press have been made of humans being affected by CWD, a 2004 study for the US Centers for Disease Control and Prevention concluded that "more epidemiologic and laboratory studies are needed to monitor the possibility of such transmissions".

A 2019 study added that "the potential exists for transmission to humans and subsequent human disease". The epidemiological study further concluded, "as a precaution, hunters should avoid eating deer and elk tissues known to harbor the CWD agent (e.g., brain, spinal cord, eyes, spleen, tonsils, lymph nodes) from areas where CWD has been identified". In April 2024, it was revealed that two men from the same hunting group contracted Creutzfeldt–Jakob, prompting medical researchers to speculate transmission had occurred from consuming CWD-positive venison.

== Signs and symptoms ==
Due to CWD taking 18–24 months after initial exposure to onset, most cases of CWD occur in adult animals; the youngest animal to exhibit clinical symptoms of the disease was 15 months. The disease is progressive and always fatal. The first signs are difficulties in movement. The most obvious and consistent clinical sign of CWD is weight loss over time. Behavioral changes also occur in the majority of cases, including decreased interactions with other animals, listlessness, lowering of the head, tremors, repetitive walking in set patterns, and nervousness. Excessive salivation and grinding of the teeth also are observed. Most deer show increased drinking and urination; the increased drinking and salivation may contribute to the spread of the disease. Loss of fear of humans and appearance of confusion are also common. The Animal and Plant Health Inspection Service summarized it as:

Behavioral changes, emaciation, weakness, ataxia, salivation, aspiration pneumonia, progressive death.

== Cause ==
The cause of CWD (like other TSEs, such as scrapie and bovine spongiform encephalopathy) is a prion, a misfolded form of a normal protein, known as prion protein (PrP), that is most commonly found in the central nervous system and peripheral nervous system. The misfolded form has been shown to be capable of converting normally folded prion protein, PrP^{C} ("C" for cellular) into an abnormal form, PrP^{Sc} ("Sc" for scrapie), thus leading to a chain reaction; CWD is thought to be transmitted by this mechanism. The abnormality in PrP has its genetic basis in a particular variant of the protein-coding gene PRNP that is highly conserved among mammals and has been found and sequenced in deer. The build-up of PrP^{Sc} in the brain is associated with widespread neurodegeneration.

=== Genetics ===
The allele which encodes leucine, codon 132 in the family of Elks, is either homozygous LL, homozygous MM, or heterozygous ML. Individuals with the first encoding seem to resist clinical signs of CWD, whereas individuals with either of the other two encodings have much shorter incubation periods.

In white-tailed deer, polymorphisms at codons 95 (Q->H) and 96 (G->S) dramatically affect CWD progression and prion strain specification. Deer containing the 96S allele have delayed progression to clinical disease onset.

When deer with the 95H polymorphism become infected, they select for altered strains of CWD.

=== Spread ===
Researchers in July 2019 stated that "with all the research on the malignity of prions, and the permanence of prions in the wider environment, and their resistance to destruction and degradation, it is necessary to reduce the potential sources of exposure to CWD." In fact an APHIS scientist observed that, while the longevity of CWD prion is unknown, the scrapie prion has been measured to endure for 16 years. PrP^{CWD} is insoluble in all but the strongest solvents, and highly resistant to digestion by proteases. PrP^{CWD} converts the normal protein PrP^{C} into more of itself upon contact, and binds together forming aggregates. Prusiner noted in 2001 that:

In the prion diseases, the initial formation of PrP^{Sc} leads to an exponential increase in the protein, which can be readily transmitted to another host

CWD prions are transmissible within the Cervidae family. The disease has not been confirmed being transmissible to humans or livestock.

Nevertheless, a 2024 study highlighted a potential link between CWD and human prion disease following the death of two hunters who consumed meat from a CWD-infected deer population. In 2022, a 72-year-old man died within a month of presenting with confusion and aggression after his friend had previously died of Creutzfeldt–Jakob. While the diagnosis was confirmed as sporadic Creutzfeldt–Jakob, researchers emphasized that cross-species transmission is plausible in animal models and could not be ruled out in this cluster, emphasizing the need for further surveillance.

How the prions that cause CWD spread is unknown, but recent research indicates that prions can be excreted by deer and elk, and are transmitted by eating grass growing in contaminated soil. Animals born in captivity and those born in the wild have been affected with the disease. Transmission of CWD is thought to be lateral (from animal to animal). Vertical transmission may occur, although it appears to be relatively unimportant in maintaining epidemics. An infected deer's saliva is able to spread the CWD prions. Exposure between animals is associated with sharing food and water sources contaminated with CWD prions shed by diseased deer.

==== Direct ====
CWD may be directly transmitted by contact with infected animals, their bodily tissues, and their bodily fluids. Spread may result from contact with infected deer regardless of if they are symptomatic.

Ticks harbor transmission-relevant quantities of infectious prions; consumption of ticks during grooming (alogrooming), a behavior typical of interactions among female deer and females and young, may contribute to oral prion exposures and between-deer (including maternal to offspring) transmission.

Recent research on Rocky Mountain elk found that with CWD-infected females, many subclinical, a high rate (80%) of maternal-to-offspring transmission of CWD prions occurred, regardless of gestational period. While not dispositive relative to disease development in the fetus, this does suggest that maternal transmission may be yet another important route of direct CWD transmission.

==== Experimental transmission ====
In addition to the cervid species in which CWD is known to naturally occur, black-tailed deer and European red deer have been demonstrated to be naturally susceptible to CWD. Other cervid species, including caribou, are also suspected to be naturally vulnerable to this disease. Many other non-cervid mammalian species have been experimentally infected with CWD, either orally or by intracerebral inoculation. These species include monkeys, sheep, cattle, prairie voles, mice, and ferrets.

An experimental case study of oral transmission of CWD to reindeer shows certain reindeer breeds may be susceptible to CWD, while other subpopulations may be protective against CWD in free-ranging populations. None of the reindeer in the study showed symptoms of CWD, potentially signifying resistance to different CWD strains.

Experimental research has also shown that CWD can be transmitted to raccoons via intracerebral inoculation, although with limited efficiency and long incubation periods, suggesting that some non-cervid wildlife may serve as incidental hosts under specific conditions.

==== Indirect ====
Environmental transmission has been linked to contact with infected bodily fluids and tissues, as well as contact with contaminated environments. Once in the environment, CWD prions may remain infectious for many years. Thus, decomposition of diseased carcasses, infected "gut piles" from hunters who field dress their cervid harvests, and the urine, saliva, feces, and antler velvet of infected individuals that are deposited in the environment, all have the potential to create infectious environmental reservoirs of CWD.

In 2013, researchers at the National Wildlife Research Center in Fort Collins, Colorado, successfully infected white-tailed deer with the misfolded prion via the nasal passage, when the prions were mixed with clay. This was important because the prions had already been shown by 2006 to bind with sandy quartz clay minerals.

One avian scavenger, the American crow, was evaluated in 2013 as a potential vector for CWD. As CWD prions remain viable after passing through the bird's digestive tract, crows represent a possible mechanism for the creation of environmental reservoirs of CWD. Additionally, the crows' extensive geographic range presents ample opportunities for them to come in contact with CWD. This, with the added population density and longevity of communal roosting sites in both urban and rural locations, suggests that the fecal deposits at roosting sites may represent a CWD environmental reservoir. Conservative estimates for crows' fecal deposits at one winter roosting site for one winter season ranged from 391,552 to 599,032 kg.

CWD prions bind so tightly to soil surface particles that the ground becomes a source of infection and may be a major route of transmission due to frequent ground contact when animals in the deer family graze.

== Prevention ==
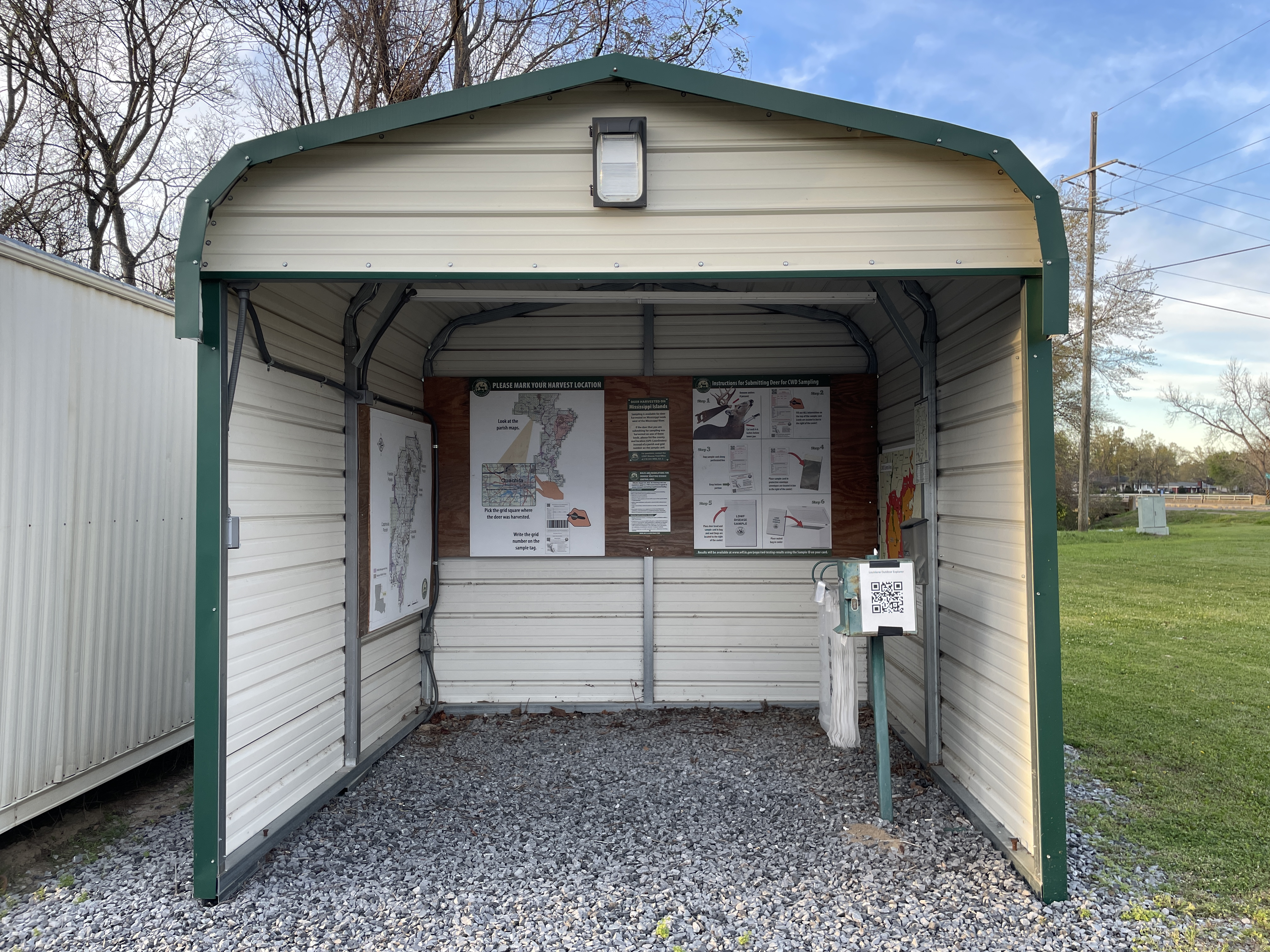
Louisiana Department of Wildlife and Fisheries Chronic Wasting Disease Testing Container Site in Tallulah, Louisiana.

By 2012, a voluntary system of control was published by APHIS in the US Federal Register. It depended on voluntary minimum standards methodology, and herd certification programs to avoid interstate movement of the disease vector. It was based on a risk management framework. As of August 2019, APHIS law in 9 CFR Part 55 - CONTROL OF CHRONIC WASTING DISEASE dealt with this problem.

Introduced for the 2019 Minnesota hunting season, a no-cost deer carcass-incineration program was rolled out by Crow Wing County officials hoping to stem the spread of CWD in the region. CWD was found among wild deer in Crow Wing County for the first time in January 2019. The voluntary program encourages both residents and visiting hunters to bring harvested deer carcasses to the county landfill east of Brainerd, Minnesota for incineration and disposal.

In Pennsylvania, the Game Commission established a network of CWD disposal dumpsters across affected regions to help hunters properly dispose of high-risk deer parts such as heads and spinal columns. This initiative, which began in 2018, aims to reduce environmental contamination and prevent the unintentional spread of infectious prions to new areas. Educational outreach and mandatory testing zones were also implemented to increase hunter compliance and awareness.

In 2023, Minnesota funded a Center for Infectious Disease Research and Policy project to assemble 70 public health experts from around the world to devise a response plan for potential human spillover. Michael Osterholm, an infectious disease expert at the University of Minnesota, stressed the urgency of preparedness, noting that the prion responsible for CWD is evolving and becoming more capable of infecting humans. Despite these concerns, a 2022 study by the National Institutes of Health indicated that the likelihood of prions infecting human brain cells remains remote.

== Diagnosis ==
Diagnosis is based on post mortem examination (necropsy) and testing; examination of the dead body is not definitive, as many animals die early in the course of the disease and conditions found are nonspecific; general signs of poor health and aspiration pneumonia, which may be the actual cause of death, are common. On microscopic examination, lesions of CWD in the central nervous system resemble those of other TSEs. In addition, scientists use immunohistochemistry to test brain, lymph, and neuroendocrine tissues for the presence of the abnormal prion protein to diagnose CWD; positive immunohistochemical findings in the obex is considered the gold standard. Conventional CWD diagnostic strategies and seeded amplification methods for amplifying CWD prions in vitro include: immunohistochemistry, western blotting, enzyme immunoassay, protein misfolding cyclic amplification, and real-time quaking-induced conversion.

Available tests at the Canadian Food Inspection Agency as of July 2019 were not sensitive enough to detect the prion in specimens from animals younger than a year old. Strategies are being developed to allow for the quantification of prion burden in a tissue, body fluid, or environmental sample.

As of 2015, no commercially feasible diagnostic tests could be used on live animals. As early as 2001 an antemortem test was deemed urgent. Running a bioassay, taking fluids from animals in the deer family suspected of infection and incubating them in transgenic mice that express the cervid prion protein, can be used to determine whether the cervid is infected, but ethical issues exist with this, and it is not scalable.

A tonsillar biopsy technique has been a reliable method of testing for CWD in live deer, but it only seems to be effective on mule deer and white-tailed deer, not elk. Biopsies of the rectal mucosa have also been effective at detecting CWD in live mule deer, white-tailed deer, and elk, though detection efficacy may be influenced by numerous factors including animal age, genotype, and disease stage.

It is possible for CWD prions to survive sterilization procedures involving an autoclave.

== Epidemiology ==
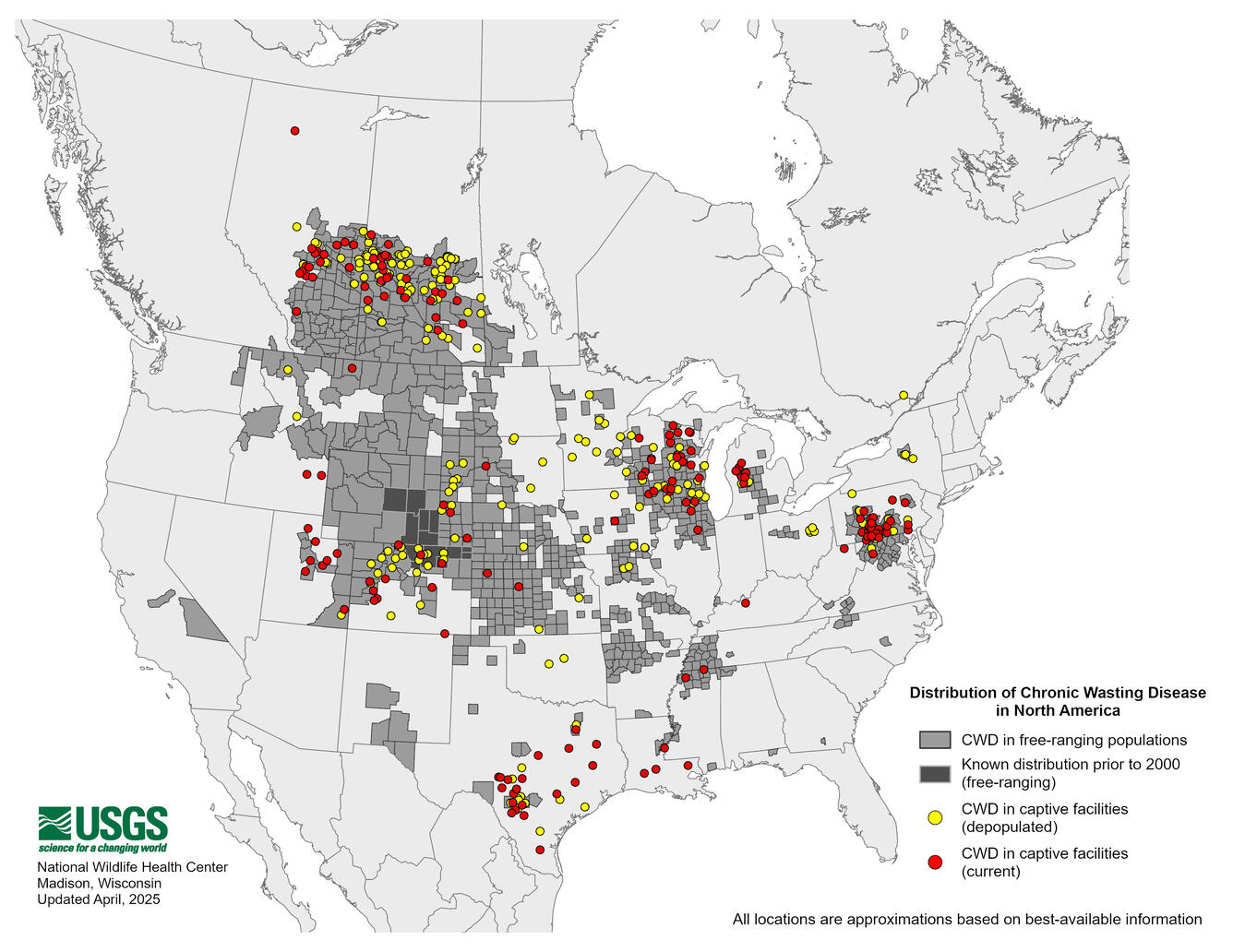
Reported cases of chronic wasting disease in North America, as of 2025

=== North America ===
The disease was first identified in 1967 in a closed herd of captive mule deer in contiguous portions of northeastern Colorado. In 1980, the disease was determined to be a TSE. It was first identified in wild elk and mule deer and white-tailed deer in the early 1980s in Colorado and Wyoming, and in farmed elk in 1997. The disease did not affect Canada until 1996.

In May 2001, CWD was also found in free-ranging deer in the southwestern corner of Nebraska (adjacent to Colorado and Wyoming) and later in additional areas in western Nebraska. The limited area of northern Colorado, southern Wyoming, and western Nebraska in which free-ranging deer, moose, and/or elk positive for CWD have been found is referred to as the endemic area. The area in 2006 has expanded to six states, including parts of eastern Utah, southwestern South Dakota, and northwestern Kansas. Also, areas not contiguous (to the endemic area) areas in central Utah and central Nebraska have been found. The limits of the affected areas are not well defined, since the disease is at a low incidence and the amount of sampling may not be adequate to detect it.

In 2002, CWD was detected in wild deer in south-central Wisconsin and northern Illinois and in an isolated area of southern New Mexico. In 2005, it was found in wild white-tailed deer in New York and in Hampshire County, West Virginia. In 2008, the first confirmed case of CWD in Michigan was discovered in an infected deer on an enclosed deer-breeding facility. It is also found in the Canadian provinces of Alberta and Saskatchewan.

In February 2011, the Maryland Department of Natural Resources reported the first confirmed case of the disease in that state. The affected animal was a white-tailed deer killed by a hunter.

CWD has also been diagnosed in farmed elk and deer herds in a number of states and in two Canadian provinces. The first positive farmed-elk herd in the United States was detected in 1997 in South Dakota. Since then, additional positive elk herds and farmed white-tailed deer herds have been found in South Dakota (7), Nebraska (4), Colorado (10), Oklahoma (1), Kansas (1), Minnesota (3), Montana (1), Wisconsin (6), and New York (2). As of fall of 2006, four positive elk herds in Colorado and a positive white-tailed deer herd in Wisconsin remain under state quarantine. All of the other herds have been depopulated or have been slaughtered and tested, and the quarantine has been lifted from one herd that underwent rigorous surveillance with no further evidence of disease. CWD also has been found in farmed elk in the Canadian provinces of Saskatchewan and Alberta. A retrospective study also showed mule deer exported from Denver to the Toronto Zoo in the 1980s were affected. In June 2015, the disease was detected in a male white-tailed deer on a breeding ranch in Medina County, Texas. State officials euthanized 34 deer in an effort to contain a possible outbreak.

In February 2018, the Mississippi Department of Wildlife, Fisheries, and Parks announced that a Mississippi deer tested positive for chronic wasting disease. Another Mississippi whitetail euthanized in Pontotoc County on 8 October 2018 tested positive for CWD. The disease was confirmed by the National Veterinary Services Laboratory in Ames, Iowa on 30 October 2018.

Species that have been affected with CWD include elk, mule deer, white-tailed deer, black-tailed deer, and moose. Other ruminant species, including wild ruminants and domestic cattle, sheep, and goats, have been housed in wildlife facilities in direct or indirect contact with CWD-affected deer and elk, with no evidence of disease transmission. However, experimental transmission of CWD into other ruminants by intracranial inoculation does result in disease, suggesting only a weak molecular species barrier exists. Research is ongoing to further explore the possibility of transmission of CWD to other species.

By April 2016, CWD had been found in captive animals in South Korea; the disease arrived there with live elk that were imported from Canada for farming in the late 1990s.

In the summer of 2018, cases were discovered in the Harpur Farm herd in Grenville-sur-la-Rouge, Quebec.

Over the course of 2018, 12% of the mule deer that were tested in Alberta, had a positive result. More than 8% of Alberta deer were deemed seropositive.

In 2022, it had been recorded that outbreaks of CWD had shown themselves in both the United States and Canada. CWD was present in 29 states, infecting herds of moose, deer and elk in 391 different counties. Alabama (1), Arkansas (19), Colorado (27), Idaho (1), Illinois (19), Iowa (12), Kansas (49), Louisiana (1), Maryland (1), Michigan (9), Minnesota (7), Mississippi (9), Missouri (21), Montana (23), Nebraska (43), New Mexico (3), New York (1), North Carolina (1), North Dakota (7), Ohio (2), Pennsylvania (14), South Dakota (19), Tennessee (14), Texas (7), Utah (7), Virginia (10), West Virginia (5), Wisconsin (37) and Wyoming (22).

In June 2023, as the spread continued, CWD was found in Oklahoma (1) in the wild and Florida (1) for the first time. A case in October 2023 in Yellowstone National Park, Wyoming, whose ecosystem supports the greatest and most diverse array of large wild mammals in the continental US, was reported. The first case in Kentucky was confirmed in December 2023.

In January 2024, British Columbia's surveillance program identified its first two positive deer samples from the Kootenay region of the province.

In April 2025, the Georgia Department of Natural Resources confirmed a second case of CWD in a 4.5-year-old male deer in Berrien County, approximately 400 yards from the first detected case.

=== Quebec farm outbreak ===
Quebec's Ministère des Forêts, de la Faune et des Parcs practiced 9500 tests in the period between 2007 and autumn 2018 before they detected a seropositive case in September 2018.

The September 2018 discovery of CWD on a managed operation in Grenville-sur-la-Rouge Quebec prompted a wholesale slaughter of 3500 animals in two months before the enterprise shut down permanently. The Canadian Food Inspection Agency ordered the cull, as well as the decontamination of 25 centimetres (9.8 in) of soil in certain places on the 400-hectare (990-acre) operation. Post-discovery, each animal was tested for CWD by the Food Inspection Agency before it was released onto the market. Other Quebec producers lamented the glut of supply. A 400 km^{2} quarantine area was declared, in which all hunting and trapping activities were banned. The government slaughtered hundreds of wild animals over a two-month period. The routine cull for market was between 70 and 100 animals per week. When the producer was forced to close, the weekly slaughter neared 500 animals per week. One year later, 750 wild specimens had been culled in the 45 km-radius "enhanced monitoring area", and none tested positive for CWD.

It came to light in August 2019 that prior to 2014 in Canada, all animals on CWD-infected farms were buried or incinerated. Since 2014, however, the Food Inspection Agency has allowed animals from CWD-infected farms to enter the food chain because there is "no national requirement to have animals tested for the disease". From one CWD-infected herd in Alberta, 131 elk were sold for human consumption.

For the fall 2019 hunting season in western Quebec, the provincial ministry relaxed the rules for the annual white-tailed deer hunt, in an effort to curb the spread of CWD. Any white-tailed deer can be hunted with any weapon in certain municipalities in the Outaouais valley and the Laurentides. The Ministère des Forêts hopes thereby to receive more samples to test for CWD. The quarantine around Grenville was still in place, and the ministry specifically prohibited (only) the "removal" from the quarantine "enhanced monitoring area" zone of "the head, more specifically any part of the brain, the eyes, the retropharyngeal lymph nodes and the tonsils, any part of the spinal column, the internal organs (including the liver and the heart), and the testicles."

=== Europe ===
==== Nordics ====
In 2016, the first case of CWD in Europe was from the Nordfjella wild reindeer herd in southern Norway. Scientists found the diseased female reindeer as it was dying, and routine CWD screening at necropsy was unexpectedly positive. The origin of CWD in Norway is unknown, whereas import of infected deer from Canada was the source of CWD cases in South Korea. Norway has strict legislation and rules not allowing importation of live animals and deer into the country. Norway has a scrapie surveillance program since 1997; while no reports of scrapie within the range of Nordfjella reindeer population have been identified, sheep are herded through that region and are a potential source of infection.

In May and June 2016, two infected wild moose (Alces alces) were found around 300 kilometres (190 mi) north from the first case, in Selbu Municipality. By the end of August, a fourth case had been confirmed in a wild reindeer shot in the same area as the first case in March.

In 2017, the Norwegian Environment Agency released guidelines for hunters hunting reindeer in the Nordfjella areas. The guidelines contain information on identifying animals with CWD symptoms and instructions for minimizing the risk of contamination, as well as a list of supplies given to hunters to be used for taking and submitting samples from shot reindeer.

In March 2018, Finnish Food Safety Authority EVIRA stated that the first case of CWD in Finland had been diagnosed in a 15-year-old moose (Alces alces) that had died naturally in the municipality of Kuhmo in the Kainuu region. Before this case in Kuhmo, Norway was the only country in the European Economic Area where CWD has been diagnosed. The moose did not have the transmissible North American form of the disease, but similar to the Norwegian variant of CWD, an atypical or sporadic form which occurs incidentally in individual animals of the deer family. In Finland, CWD screening of fallen wild deer has been done since 2003. None of the roughly 2,500 samples analyzed so far have tested positive for the disease. The export of live animals of the deer family to other countries has been temporarily banned as a precautionary measure to stop the spread of the CWD, and moose hunters are going to be provided with more instructions before the start of the next hunting season, if appropriate. The export and sales of meat from deer will not be restricted and moose meat is considered safe to eat as only the brain and nervous tissue of infected moose contains prions.

In March 2019, the Swedish National Veterinary Institute diagnosed the first case of CWD in Sweden. A 16-year old emaciated female moose was found in the municipality of Arjeplog in the county of Norrbotten, circling and with loss of shyness towards humans, possibly blind. The moose was euthanized and the head was sent for CWD screening in the national CWD surveillance program. The brainstem tissue, but not lymph nodes, was positive for CWD (confirmed with Western Blot). A second case of CWD was diagnosed in May 2019, with very similar case history, about 70 km east of the first case. This second case, in the municipality of Arvidsjaur, was also an emaciated and apathic 16-year-old female moose that was euthanized. The circumstances of these Swedish cases are similar to the CWD cases in moose in both Norway and Finland. The EU regulated CWD surveillance runs between 2018 – 2020. A minimum of 6,000 deer are to be tested, both free-ranging animals in the deer family, farmed red deer, and semi-domesticated reindeer.

The finding of CWD-positive moose initiated an intensified surveillance in the affected municipalities. Adult hunter-harvested moose and slaughtered semi-domesticated reindeer from the area are tested for CWD. In September 2019, a third moose was found positive for CWD, a hunter-harvested 10-year-old apparently healthy female moose from Arjeplog. A fourth case of CWD in moose was verified in September 2020, in a euthanized 14-year-old lame and unshy female moose in the municipality of Robertsfors, in the county of Västerbotten, approximately 200 km from the previous moose cases in the neighboring county of Norrbotten.

== Research ==
Research is focused on better ways to monitor disease in the wild, live animal diagnostic tests, developing vaccines, better ways to dispose of animals that died from the disease and to decontaminate the environment, where prions can persist in soils, and better ways to monitor the food supply. Deer harvesting and management issues are intertwined.

Additionally, scientists are investigating genetic resistance to CWD in certain deer populations, with the goal of understanding whether selective breeding or natural selection could help slow disease spread. Public outreach and hunter education programs have also become a key part of management strategies, aiming to improve compliance with carcass disposal regulations, testing requirements, and movement restrictions in affected regions.
