= Protein misfolding cyclic amplification =

Test for prion disease

Protein misfolding cyclic amplification (PMCA) is an amplification technique (conceptually like polymerase chain reaction (PCR) but not involving nucleotides) to multiply misfolded prions originally developed by Soto and colleagues. It is a test for spongiform encephalopathies like chronic wasting disease (CWD) or bovine spongiform encephalopathy (BSE).

== Technique ==
The technique initially incubates a small amount of abnormal prion with an excess of normal protein, so that some conversion takes place. The growing chain of misfolded protein is then blasted with ultrasound, breaking it down into smaller chains and so rapidly increasing the amount of abnormal protein available to cause conversions. By repeating the cycle, the mass of normal protein is rapidly changed into the prion being tested for.

=== Automation ===
The technology has been automated, leading to a dramatic increase in the efficiency of amplification. Now, a single cycle results in a 2500-fold increase in sensitivity of detection over western blotting, whereas 2 and 7 consecutive cycles result in 6 million and 3 billion-fold increases in sensitivity of detection over western blotting, a technique widely used in BSE surveillance in several countries.

=== Starting material ===
PMCA was originally based on the normal prion protein (PrP^{C}) from healthy brain tissue, which is expensive. The advent of recombinant proteins have lower the cost somewhat, but the steps required to obtain the pure protein are laborious. In 2011, it was found that simply putting a prion protein transgene into a cell line and then lysing the cell without purification is enough. This is expected to make PMCA much cheaper. The cell line does not need to be of a neuronal origin.

PMCA is most easily performed with catalysts which are abundant even in healthy cells: a polyanion (single-stranded RNA or sulfated glycans) and a phospholipid. A cell lysate would provide both of these catalysts and most clumps of PrP^{Sc} contain catalyst polyanion molecules anyways. Synthetic versions of these catalysts such as poly(A) RNA and 1-palmitoyl-2-oleoylphosphatidylglycerol (POPG) also work for propagating PrP^{Sc}.

Additional required materials include buffer salts and detergent.

=== Unseeded PMCA ===
PMCA can work even without a starting mass of PrP^{Sc}. While this behavior is not desirable for those using PMCA as a detection tool, it has implications for understanding the nature of the TSE pathogen. This conversion is analogous to the sporadic form of TSE.

- RNA from healthy mouse liver combined with POPG can convert recombinant PrP^{C} made in E. coli into PrP^{Sc} in 17 cycles.
- Buffer salts and detergent alone can recombinant Syrian hamster PrP^{C} made in E. coli into PrP^{Sc} in 18 cycles.

In analogy to the familial form of TSE, PMCA can easily generate PrP^{Sc} from PrP^{C} carrying familial-TSE mutations.

== Uses ==
=== Prion proteins ===
The PMCA technology has been used by several groups to understand the molecular mechanism of prion replication, the nature of the infectious agent, the phenomenon of prion strains and species barrier, the effect of cellular components, to detect PrP^{Sc} in tissues and biological fluids and to screen for inhibitors against prion replication. Recent studies by the groups of Supattapone and Ma were able to produce prion replication in vitro by PMCA using purified PrP^{C} and recombinant PrP^{C} with the sole addition of synthetic polyanions and lipids. These studies have shown that infectious prions can be produced in the absence of any other cellular component and constitute some of the strongest evidence in favor of the prion hypothesis.

PMCA has been applied to replicate the misfolded protein from diverse species. The newly generated protein exhibits the same biochemical, biological, and structural properties as brain-derived PrP^{Sc} and strikingly it is infectious to wild type animals, producing a disease with similar characteristics as the illness produced by brain-isolated prions.

=== Alpha-synuclein ===
Research in 2020 concluded that protein misfolding cyclic amplification could be used to distinguish between two progressive neurodegenerative diseases, Parkinson's disease and multiple system atrophy, being the first process to give an objective diagnosis of multiple system atrophy instead of just a differential diagnosis.

== Sensitivity ==
It has been shown that PMCA is capable of detecting as little as a single molecule of oligomeric infectious PrP^{Sc}. PMCA possesses the ability to generate millions infectious units, starting with the equivalent to one PrP^{Sc} oligomer; well below the infectivity threshold. This data demonstrates that PMCA has a similar power of amplification as PCR techniques used to amplify DNA. It opens a great promise for development of a highly sensitive detection of PrP^{Sc}, and for understanding the molecular basis of prion replication. Indeed, PMCA has been used by various groups to detect PrP^{Sc} in blood of animals experimentally infected with prions during both the symptomatic and pre-symptomatic phases as well as in urine.

== Development ==
PMCA was originally developed to, in vitro, mimic prion replication with a similar efficiency to the in vivo process, but with accelerated kinetics. PMCA is conceptually analogous to the polymerase chain reaction - in both systems a template grows at the expense of a substrate in a cyclic reaction, combining growing and multiplication of the template units.

== See also ==
- Real-time quaking-induced conversion
- Western blotting
