= Animal product =

Material derived from non-human animal body

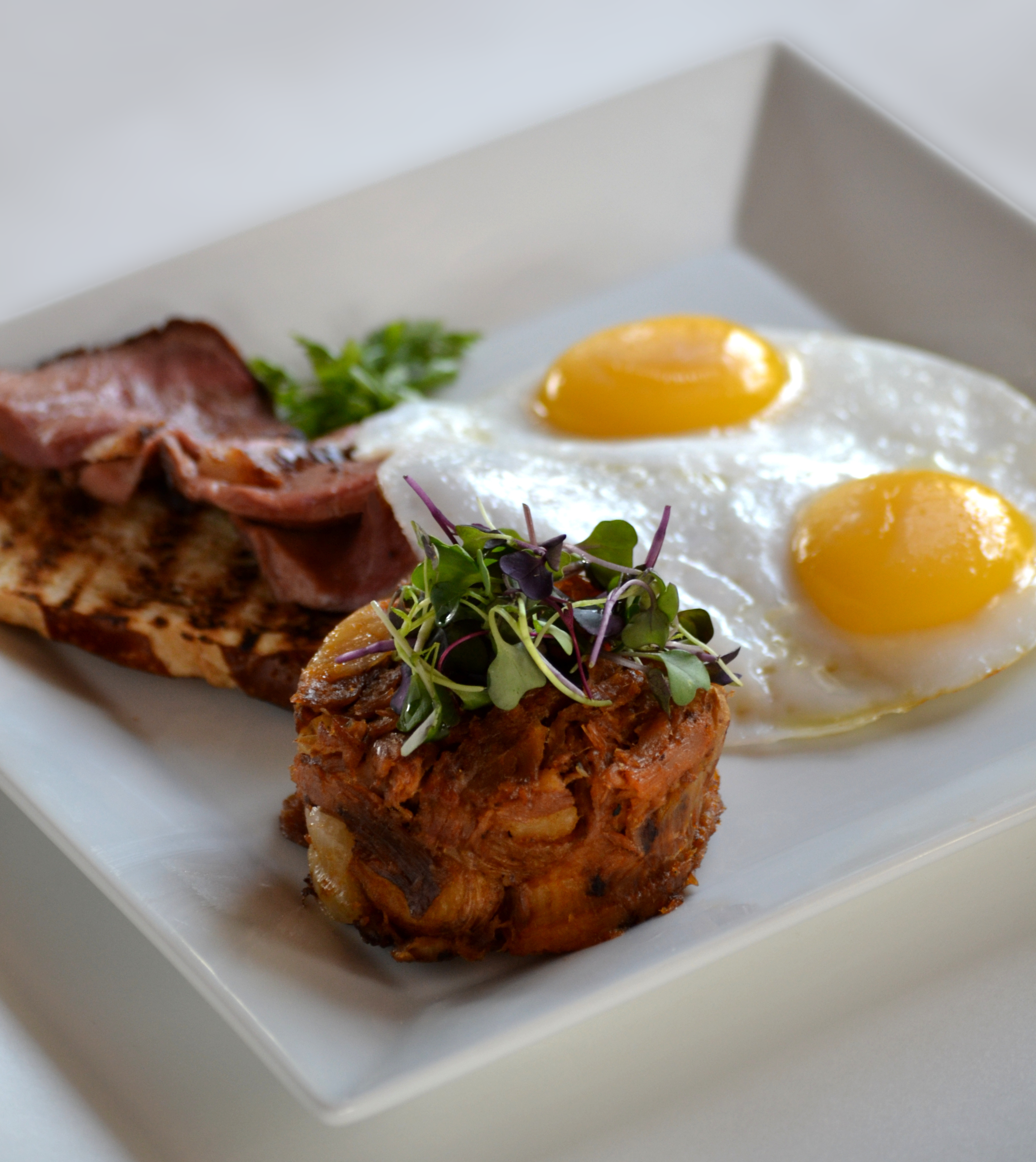
A dish called "Duck, Duck, Duck" because the three parts come from the complex body of the duck: duck eggs, duck confit and roast duck breast

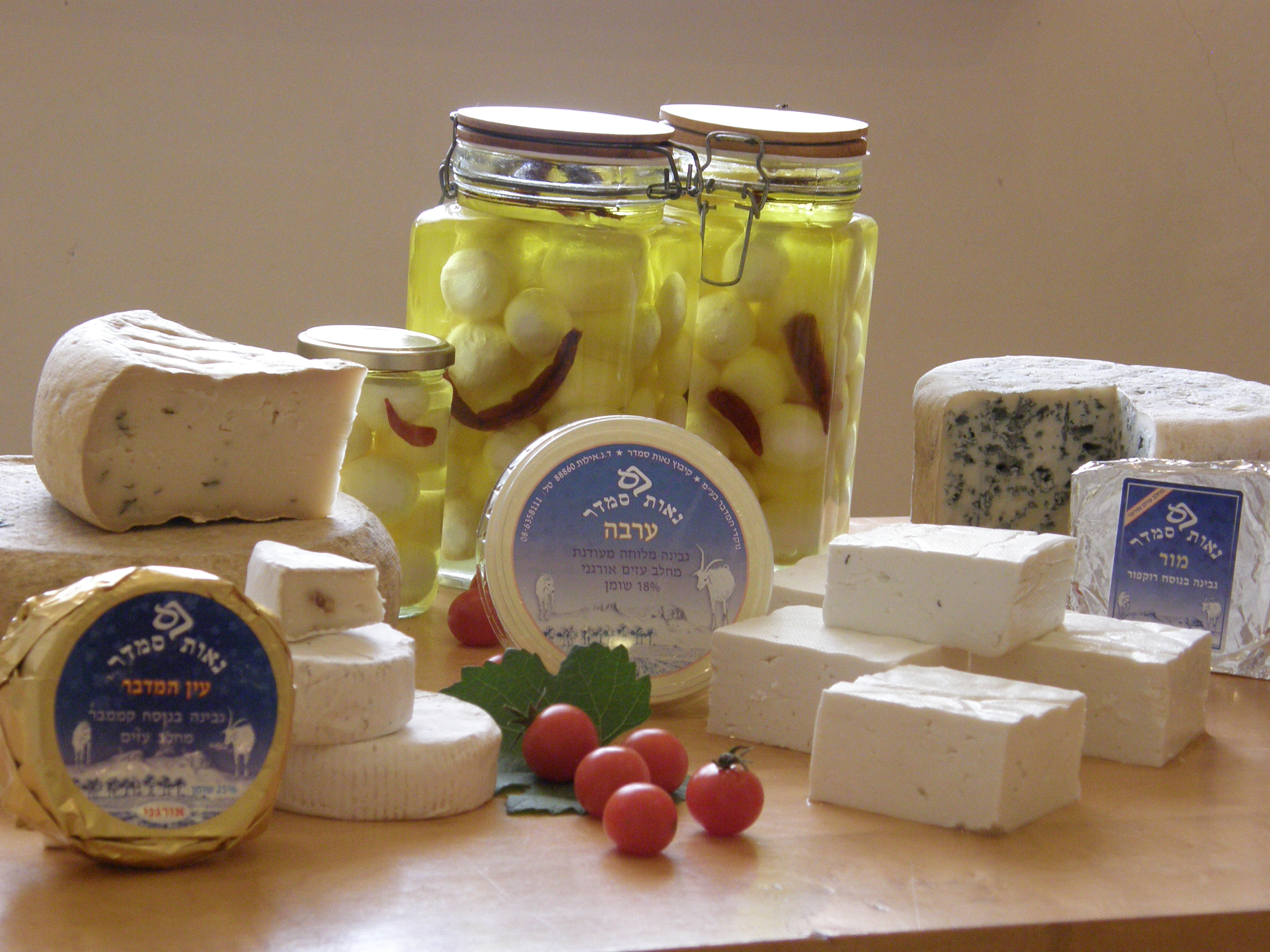
Varieties of goat cheese

An animal product is any material derived from the body of a non-human animal or their excretions. Examples are meat, fat, blood, milk, eggs, honey, and less known products, such as isinglass, rennet, and cochineal.

The word animals includes all species in the biological kingdom Animalia, except humans. This includes, for example, tetrapods, arthropods, fish, and mollusks. Generally, products made from decomposed animals, such as petroleum, or crops grown in soil fertilized with animal remains or manure are not characterized as animal products. Products sourced from humans (e.g. breast milk) are not typically classified as animal products.

Increased production and consumption over the past 50 years has led to widespread environmental and animal welfare impacts. These range from being linked to 80% of Amazonian deforestation to the welfare implications of using chick culling shredders on live day old-chicks for 7 billion of them each year.

Several popular diet patterns prohibit the inclusion of some categories of animal products and may also limit the conditions of when other animal products may be permitted. This includes but not limited to secular diets; like, vegetarian, pescetarian, and paleolithic diets, as well as religious diets, such as kosher, halal, mahayana, macrobiotic, and sattvic diets. Other diets, such as vegan-vegetarian diets and all its subsets exclude any material of animal origin. Scholarly, the term animal source foods (ASFs) has been used to refer to these animal products and by-products collectively.

In international trade legislation, the terminology products of animal origin (POAO) is used for referring to foods and goods that are derived from animals or have close relation to them.

The meat industry is a large one, as is fish processing, yielding fish products. Beyond the food industries, animal products play important roles in various chemical industries (including agrochemicals (e.g., fertilizers), personal care products, and others) and in the leather industry.

== Effects of production ==
=== Environmental impact ===
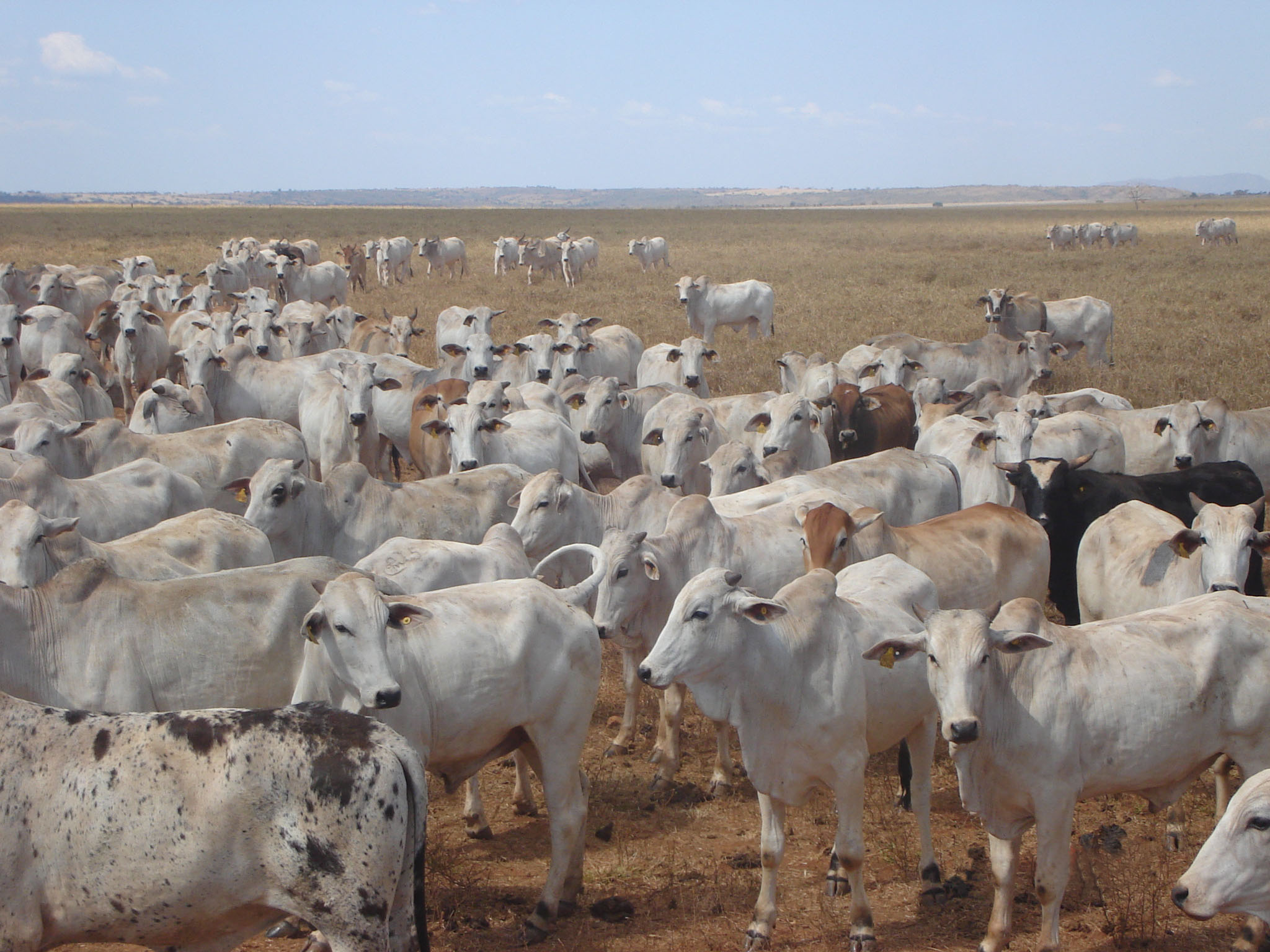
Livestock production requires large areas of land.

Animal husbandry has a significant impact on the world environment. Both production and consumption of animal products have increased rapidly. Since 1950, meat production has tripled, dairy production has doubled, and egg production has increased almost fourfold. Meanwhile, meat consumption has nearly doubled worldwide. Developing countries had a surge in meat consumption, particularly of monogastric livestock. Animal husbandry drives climate change, ocean acidification, and biodiversity loss, and kills 60 billion animals annually. It uses between 20 and 33% of the world's fresh water, Livestock, and the production of feed for them, occupy about a third of the Earth's ice-free land. Livestock production contributes to species extinction, desertification, and habitat destruction. and is the primary driver of the Holocene extinction. Some 70% of the agricultural land and 30% of Earth's land surface is involved directly or indirectly in animal husbandry. Habitat is destroyed by clearing forests and converting land to grow feed crops and for grazing, while predators and herbivores are frequently targeted because of a perceived threat to livestock profits; for example, animal husbandry causes up to 91% of the deforestation in the Amazon region. In addition, livestock produce greenhouse gases. Cows produce some 570 million cubic metres of methane per day, that accounts for 35 to 40% of the overall methane emissions of the planet. Further, livestock production is responsible for 65% of all human-related emissions of nitrous oxide.

=== Animal welfare ===
Since the 18th century, people have become increasingly concerned about the welfare of farm animals. Possible measures of welfare include longevity, behavior, physiology, reproduction, freedom from disease, and freedom from immunosuppression. Standards and laws for animal welfare have been created worldwide, broadly in line with the most widely held position in the western world, a form of utilitarianism: that it is morally acceptable for humans to use non-human animals, provided that no unnecessary suffering is caused, and that the benefits to humans outweigh the costs to the livestock. An opposing view is that animals have rights, should not be regarded as property, are not necessary to use, and should never be used by humans. Live export of animals has risen to meet increased global demand for livestock, such as in the Middle East. Animal rights activists have objected to the long-distance transport of animals; one result was the banning of live exports from New Zealand in 2003.

=== Net animal losses ===
Farmed animals needs to eat more food than their products can deliver. Net animal losses are the difference between the calories in human-edible crops fed to animals and the calories returned in meat, dairy and fish. These losses are higher than all other conventional food losses combined. This is because on average livestock eat more human-edible food than their products provide. Research estimated that if the US would eat all human-edible plant food instead of feeding it to animals in order to eat their meat, dairy and eggs, it would free up enough food to feed an additional 350 million people. At a global level livestock is fed an average of 1738 kcal/person/day of human-edible food, and just 594 kcal/p/d of animal products return to the human food supply, a net loss of 66%.

== Animal by-products ==
Animal by-products, as defined by the USDA, are products harvested or manufactured from livestock other than muscle meat. In the EU, animal by-products (ABPs) are defined somewhat more broadly, as materials from animals that people do not consume. Thus, chicken eggs for human consumption are considered by-products in the US but not France; whereas eggs destined for animal feed are classified as animal by-products in both countries. This does not in itself reflect on the condition, safety, or wholesomeness of the product.

Animal by-products are carcasses and parts of carcasses from slaughterhouses, animal shelters, zoos and veterinarians, and products of animal origin not intended for human consumption, including catering waste. These products may go through a process known as rendering to be made into human and non-human foodstuffs, fats, and other material that can be sold to make commercial products such as cosmetics, paint, cleaners, polishes, glue, soap and ink. The sale of animal by-products allows the meat industry to compete economically with industries selling sources of vegetable protein.

=== Slaughterhouse waste ===
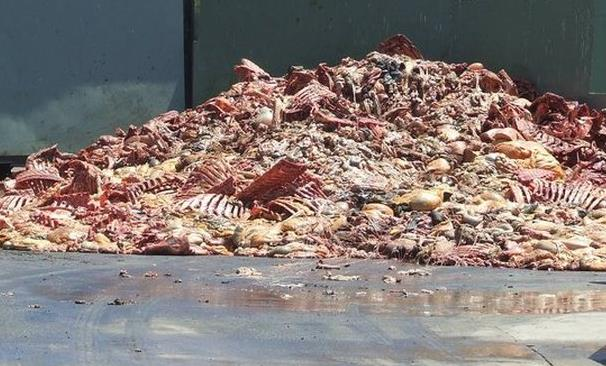
Slaughterhouse waste

Slaughterhouse waste is defined as animal body parts cut off in the preparation of carcasses for use as food. This waste can come from several sources, including slaughterhouses, restaurants, stores and farms. In the UK, slaughterhouse waste is classed as category 3 risk waste in the Animal By-Products Regulations, with the exception of condemned meat which is classed as category 2 risk.

=== Animal by-products in pet food ===
The leftover pieces that come from the process of stripping meat from animals tends to get used for different purposes. One of them is to put these parts into pet food. Many large, well-known pet food brands use animal by-products as protein sources in their recipes. This can include animal feet, livers, lungs, heads, spleens, etc or an admixture in the form of meat and bone meal. These organs are usually not eaten by humans depending on culture, but are safe and nutritious for pets regardless. By-products can also include bad-looking pieces. They are always cooked (rendered) to kill pathogens.

Just under half of all animal products in pet food is still human consumable, and some pet food makers advertise the lack of by-products to appeal to buyers, a move criticized for contributing to food waste and reducing sustainability.

== Additives ==
- Carmine, derived from crushed cochineal beetles, is a red or purple substance commonly used in food products. It is common in food products such as juice, candy, and yogurt. The presence of carmine in these products has been a source of controversy. One major source of controversy was the use of carmine in Starbucks frappuccinos. Carmine is an allergen according to the FDA. It takes about 70,000 female insects to produce a pound of dye.
- L-cysteine from human hair and pig bristles (used in the production of biscuits, bread and dietary supplements)
- Rennet (commonly used in the production of cheese)
- Shellac (commonly used for food dye, food glaze and medicine glaze)
- Swiftlet's nest (made of saliva)

== Food ==
- Ambrosia, also known as "bee bread" (which is made from both plant pollen and the insect's secretions)
- Arachnids
- Blood, especially in the form of blood sausage (see also Blood as taboo food)
- Bone, including bone char, bone meal, etc.
- Broths and stocks created with animal fat, bone, and connective tissue
- Caviar
- Casein (found in milk and cheese)
- Civet oil (food flavoring additive)
- Dairy products (e.g., milk, cheese, yogurt, etc.)
- Eggs and egg products (e.g., mayonnaise, eggnog, custard, etc.)
- Escargot pearls
- Fat (e.g., lard, lardon, schmaltz, suet, tallow, etc.)
- Gelatin (used to make candy, ice cream, and marshmallows)
- Hard roe (as food is used as a raw or cooked ingredient in various dishes)
- Honey (including comb honey products)
- Honeydew
- Isinglass (used in clarification of beer and wine)
- Insects (some edible insects are consumed whole or made into a powder, like cricket flour. The flours are then used to make products like insect fitness bars or burger patties)
- Kopi luwak and Black Ivory Coffee
- Meat (which includes fish, shellfish, sauces made from them, and poultry in addition to livestock, game, and "exotic dishes" made from amphibians or reptiles)
- Offal
- Skins (remaining skin scraps as a by-product of meat production or fat rendering are made profitable by being fried/roasted and sold as snacks, like; gribenes, rinds, scratchings, and rambak)
- Snake wine (also used as medicine)
- Soft roe, also known as "white roe" (commonly fried, used as an ingredient in a larger dish, or used as a condiment in some European and Asian countries)
- Whey (found in cheese and added to many other products)

== Non-food animal products ==
- Animal fiber
- Ambergris
- Bear bile (used to make medicine)
- Beeswax
- Blood and some blood substitutes (blood used for transfusions is always human in origin, though some blood substitutes are made from animal sources. Many diagnostic laboratory tests use animal or human sourced reagents)
- Bezoar stone
- Casein (used in plastics, clothing, cosmetics, adhesives and paint)
- Castoreum (secretion of the beaver used in perfumes and possibly in food flavoring)
- Civet oil
- Coral rock (precious coral in particular is beloved for jewelry making)
- Donkey milk
- Egg oil (used in skin care products as a preservative and as skin conditioning agent)
- Emu oil (serves as a "natural" emollient in cosmetic preparations, especially in products that claim it has the ability enhance and maintain beauty)
- Ejaculate (used in artificial insemination)
- Feathers
- Fishmeal
- Fur
- Gallstones (from livestock for Traditional Chinese Medicine)
- Gelatin used in non-food applications, such as photographic films and papers
- Guano
- Hide
- Horse oil (used in East Asian skincare masks and creams for similar purposes as emu oil)
- Horn, including antlers etc.
- Ivory
- Lanolin
- Limulus amebocyte lysate (a chemical in horseshoe crab blood used to detect bacterial endotoxin)
- Leather
- Manure
- Mink lashes
- Mink oil
- Musk
- Nautilus (decorative shell or pearl alternative)
- Ovine Placenta
- Pearl or mother of pearl (treated as a precious gem for making jewelry or adorning clothing & accessories. Pearl powder is used as a natural skincare product for hydrating & healing the skin as well as lightening, brightening and maintaining youthfulness of the complexion)
- Royal jelly (used as a dietary supplement)
- Scales (fish scales are often used in makeup to impart a refractive & pearlescent finish)
- Silk
- Sponges
- Skunk oil
- Snail Mucin (used in topical medications and skincare products as a treatment for lesions and acne or as an antioxidant to brighten and hydrate the skin)
- Stearin
- Tallow (be used in food and soap)
- Tortoiseshell
- Urine
- Venom (used to produce human and veterinary antivenin)
- Whale oil
- Wool

== See also ==
- Advanced meat recovery
- Biodegradable waste
- Boiling down
- Food quality
- Food safety
- List of waste types
- Meat extender
- Mechanically separated meat
- Pink slime
- Potted meat food product
- Spam (food)
- Veganism as alternatives to animal products
