= Ostrich farming in North America =

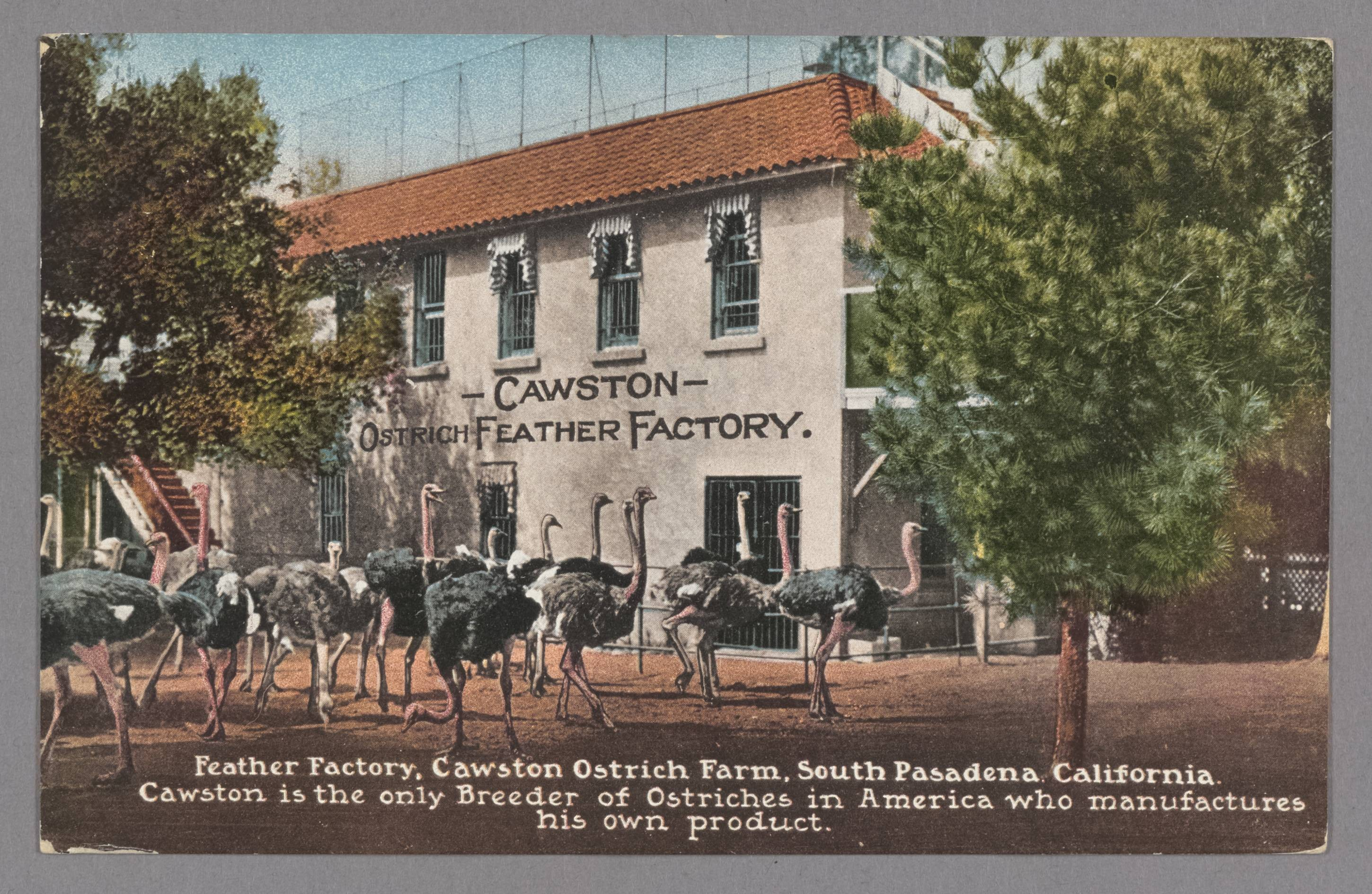
Feather Factory, Cawston Ostrich Farm, South Pasadena, California.

Ostrich farming in North America refers to the practice of breeding, raising, and managing ostriches for their meat, feathers, leather, oil, and other byproducts. While ostriches are native to Africa, their farming has become increasingly popular in North America due to the demand for alternative and sustainable meat sources, as well as the unique characteristics of ostrich products.

Ostriches require less water and feed than cattle, and their farming results in lower greenhouse gas emissions.

== History ==
Ostrich farming in North America began in the late 19th century, initially focusing on the production of feathers, which were highly prized for fashion accessories. The first ostrich farm was established by Charles Sketchley in California where the climate was similar to the ostriches' native habitat in Africa. However, the industry saw a decline in the early 20th century due to changes in fashion trends and the economic impacts of the Great Depression. The industry experienced a resurgence in the late 20th century, particularly in the 1980s due to the rise in consumer demand for ostrich products and the rising prices from the U.S. trade ban with South Africa.
