= Wu Yin =

Wu Yin may refer to:

- Wu Yin (Qing dynasty), co-founder of the Xiling Seal Society
- Wu Yin (actress) (1909–91), Chinese film and drama actress
- Wu Yin (handballer) (born 1988), Chinese team handball player

== See also ==
- Wu Ying (born 1981), businesswoman convicted of financial fraud
