= Specified risk material =

Tissues of ruminants not fit for human consumption

Specified risk material (SRM) is any of various tissues of ruminant animals that cannot be inspected and passed for human food because scientists have determined that bovine spongiform encephalopathy (BSE)-causing prions concentrate there, representing a biological food safety hazard to consumers. The term was referred to in the United Kingdom's Specified Risk Material Order 1997 (S.I. 1997/2964), in the United States Department of Agriculture's, and in the Canadian Food Inspection Agency's regulatory response to the first confirmed U.S. BSE case in December 2003.

== BSE ==
The BSE infective agent has been found to concentrate in specific tissues of BSE-infected cattle.

=== BSE SRMs ===
BSE SRMs

SRMs can include brains, eyes, spinal cord, and other organs; the exact definition varies by jurisdiction. Under the US regulations, SRMs are defined as: the skull, brain, trigeminal ganglia (nerves attached to brain and close to the skull exterior), eyes, spinal cord, vertebral column (excluding the vertebrae of the tail, the transverse processes of the lumbar and thoracic vertebrae, and the wings of the sacrum), the dorsal root ganglia (nerves attached to the spinal cord and close to the vertebral column, which is removed to be certain the dorsal root ganglia is extracted in its entirety) of cattle aged 30 months or older; and the tonsils and distal ileum (a part of the small intestine) of all cattle.

On January 12, 2004, the Food Safety and Inspection Service (FSIS) of the USDA published new rules banning such materials from the human food supply. In the European Union, SRMs are also excluded by law from the human and animal food chain. Most countries in the Americas (including the United States and Canada) and Europe are officially recognized by the World Organisation for Animal Health (WOAH) as having a negligible BSE risk status.

=== Removal of BSE SRMs ===
The Food and Agriculture Organization of the United Nations (FAO), World Health Organization (WHO), and WOAH have jointly established recommendations for SRM removal based on the level of risk. All SRMs must be removed at slaughter and disposed as inedible material.

== See also ==
- Advanced meat recovery (AMR)
- Mechanically separated meat (MSM)
