= Ostrich oil =

Oil derived from ostrich body fat

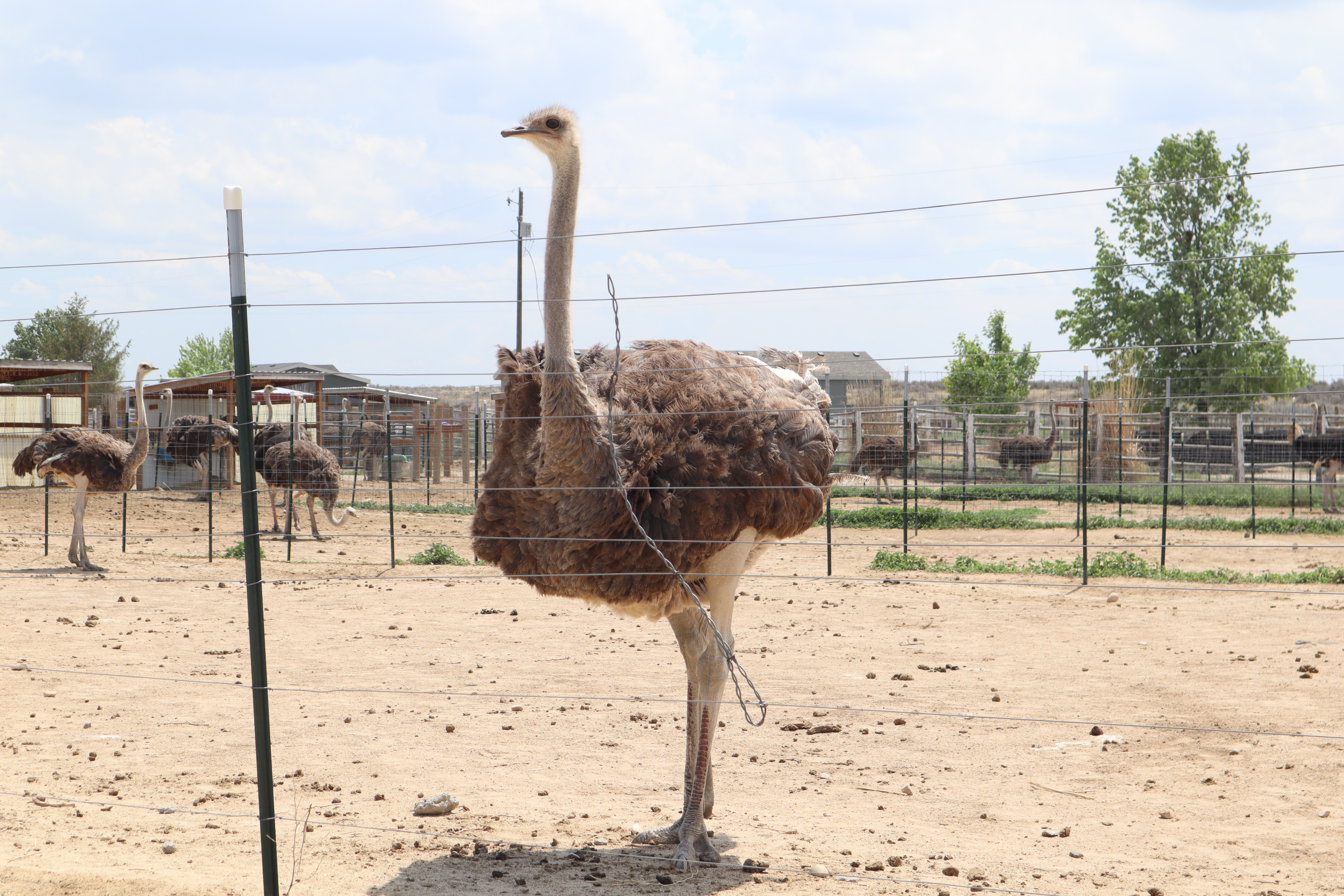
An ostrich, the source of ostrich oil

Ostrich oil is an oil derived from the fat of ostriches. Ostrich oil is composed of 36.51% of saturated fat, 46.75% of monounsaturated fat, and 18.24% of polyunsaturated fat. Ostrich oil contains fatty acids, such as omega-3, omega-6, and omega-9. It also contains vitamins and minerals like vitamin E and selenium, which serve as natural antioxidants. Emu oil in the USA has a similar composition to ostrich oil, but ostrich oil has a higher omega-3 content, containing 2.1% compared to 0.25% in emu oil.

Ostrich oil has antibacterial properties, and is used for various skincare purposes, such as inflammation reduction. Due to the moisturizing properties, ostrich oil is currently used in cosmetic formulations and food chemistry. Ostrich oil is also used in the food industry as it has fatty acids and tocopherols, and a low cholesterol content.

== See also ==
- Emu oil
- Ostrich meat
- Ostrich farming in North America
