= Wu Ying =

Chinese financial fraudster (born 1981)

- 吴英
- Born: May 20, 1981 (age 45); Dongyang, Zhejiang, China
- Education: Vocational school dropout
- Occupation: Founder of Bense Group
- Employer: Bense Group
- Known for: Formerly 6th richest woman in China
- Status: In prison
- Convictions: Financial fraud, illegal fundraising
- Penalty: Death penalty with a two-year reprieve, commuted to a life sentence, reduced to 25 years

Wu Ying (Chinese: 吴英; pinyin: Wú Yīng, born 20 May 1981) is an entrepreneur from the city of Dongyang in Zhejiang Province, and formerly the sixth-richest woman in China. She was convicted of financial fraud and initially sentenced to death, but the sentence was overturned by the Supreme Court of China. On 21 May 2012 her sentence was reduced to death with a two-year reprieve, which was commuted to a life sentence in 2014. On 23 March 2018, her life sentence was further reduced to 25 years.

== Early life and career ==
The eldest of four sisters, Wu Ying was born in May 1981 to a farmer's family in the village of Tangxia in Dongyang. After graduating from middle school in 1997, she studied accounting at a local vocational school, but dropped out after a year and a half to work at her aunt's beauty salon. Later she opened her own beauty parlour on Dongyang's West Street and claimed to have made huge profits selling sheep placenta extract, a popular anti-aging product in China. She also opened a car rental company in nearby Yiwu.

== Bense Group ==
In 2005, Wu Ying founded the Bense Group in Dongyang, and in the following year registered 15 separate companies under the group with a total registered capital of 300 million yuan, and made high-profile donations of 6.3 million yuan to charities. Her sudden wealth and fame caused a sensation in the Chinese media and there were wild speculations about the source of her apparent wealth.

In 2006, aged only 25, she was ranked by the influential Hurun Report as the sixth-richest woman and the 68th-richest person in China, with a net worth of 3.6 billion yuan (US$567 million).

== Trials and sentencing ==
Wu Ying was arrested in February 2007 for illegal fundraising and fraud, and was tried in April 2009 at the Intermediate People's Court in Jinhua, a prefecture-level city that administers Dongyang. She was initially charged with illegal fundraising, with a maximum sentence of 15 years' imprisonment, but the charges were later changed to the more serious crime of financial fraud, which in China was punishable by death.

The indictment alleged that between May 2005 and February 2007, Wu Ying had illegally raised 770 million yuan from the public by promising them high investment returns, and only 380 million yuan was recovered when she was arrested. Wu Ying's attorney Yang Zhaodong, however, contested that she merely borrowed the money from 11 of her friends and invested the funds in profitable businesses. In December 2009, the court found her guilty and sentenced her to death. Wu Ying appealed to the Zhejiang Provincial Court, but on 18 January 2012, the provincial court upheld the conviction and the death penalty.

== Death penalty debate ==
Wu Ying's death sentence had created an outpouring of sympathy from the public as well as official Chinese media, and ignited an enormous outcry criticizing the Chinese legal system for treating private citizens like Wu far more harshly than corrupt officials. Many have called for leniency and abolition of the capital punishment for economic crimes. In March 2012, Chinese Prime Minister Wen Jiabao said at a news conference that Wu Ying's case should be carefully handled by the Supreme Court. His statement was interpreted as a call for rejecting Wu's death penalty.

== Sentence reduced ==
Chinese law requires review and approval by the Supreme Court of all death sentences. On 20 April 2012, the Supreme Court announced its decision. While reaffirming the guilty verdict, the high court overturned the death penalty and sent her case back to the Zhejiang Provincial Court for re-sentencing. The decision was praised by Wu Ying's supporters and opponents of the death penalty. On 21 May 2012, her sentence was reduced to death with a two-year reprieve, which is usually commuted to a life sentence after two years. On 11 July 2014, her death sentence was commuted to a life sentence. On 23 March 2018, her life sentence was reduced to 25 years.
