= Pink slime =

Meat by-product

External media

Images
- Pink slime kibble
- Giant rolls of pink slime being flash frozen

Video
- March 26, 2012. "'Pink Slime' Manufacturer Suspends Operations". ABC News.
- March 16, 2012. "The Facts About Lean Finely Textured Beef". American Meat Institute

Lean finely textured beef in its finished form, from an ABC News report about the product

Lean finely textured beef (LFTB)—also called finely textured beef, boneless lean beef trimmings (BLBT), and colloquially known as pink slime—is a meat by-product used as a food additive to ground beef and beef-based processed meats, as a filler, or to reduce the overall fat content of ground beef. As part of the production process, heat and centrifuges remove the fat from the meat in beef trimmings. The resulting paste, without the fat, is exposed to ammonium hydroxide or citric acid to kill bacteria. In 2001, the United States Department of Agriculture (USDA) approved the product for limited human consumption. The product, when prepared using ammonia gas, is banned for human consumption in Canada, and production of all mechanically separated meat from ruminants, including cattle, is prohibited in the European Union.

In March 2012, an ABC News series about "pink slime" included claims that approximately 70% of ground beef sold in US supermarkets contained the additive at that time. Some companies and organizations stopped offering ground beef with the product. "Pink slime" was claimed by some originally to have been used as pet food and cooking oil and later approved for public consumption, but this was disputed in April 2012, by both the Food and Drug Administration (FDA) administrator responsible for approving the product, and by Beef Products, Inc. (BPI), the largest US producer of the additive. In September 2012, BPI filed a defamation lawsuit against ABC for false claims about the product. By 2017, BPI was seeking $1.9 billion in damages. On June 28, 2017, The Walt Disney Company, ABC's parent company, paid at least US$177 million to settle the lawsuit. Counsel for BPI stated that this was at that time the largest amount ever paid in a media defamation case in the United States.

The product is regulated in different manners in various regions. In the US, the product is allowed to be used in ground beef, and it can be used in other meat products such as beef-based processed meats. The use of ammonium hydroxide as an anti-microbial agent is approved by the Food and Drug Administration, and is included on the FDA's list of GRAS (generally recognized as safe) procedures, and is used in similar applications for numerous other food products, including puddings and baked goods. The product is not allowed in Canada due to the presence of ammonia, and is banned for human consumption in the European Union. Some consumer advocacy groups have promoted the elimination of the product or for mandatory disclosure of additives in beef, while others have expressed concerns about plant closures that occurred after the product received significant news media coverage.

In December 2018, pink slime was reclassified as "ground beef" by the Food Safety and Inspection Service of the United States Department of Agriculture.

== Production and content ==
Finely textured meat is produced by heating boneless beef trimmings (the last traces of skeletal muscle meat, scraped, shaved, or pressed from the bone) to 107–109 °F (42–43 °C), removing the melted fat by centrifugal force using a centrifuge, and flash freezing the remaining product to 15 °F (−9 °C) in 90 seconds in a roller press freezer. The roller press freezer is a type of freezer that was invented in 1971 by BPI CEO Eldon Roth that can "freeze packages of meat in two minutes" and began to be used at Beef Products Inc. in 1981. The lean finely textured beef is added to ground beef as a filler or to reduce the overall fat content of ground beef. In March 2012 about 70% of ground beef sold in US supermarkets contained the product. It is also used as a filler in hot dogs produced in the United States.

The recovered beef material is extruded through long tubes that are thinner than a pencil, during which time at the BPI processing plant, the meat is exposed to gaseous ammonia. At Cargill Meat Solutions, citric acid is used to kill bacteria such as E. coli and Salmonella instead. Gaseous ammonia in contact with the water in the meat produces ammonium hydroxide. The ammonia sharply increases the pH and damages microscopic organisms, the freezing causes ice crystals to form and puncture the organisms' weakened cell walls, and the mechanical stress destroys the organisms altogether. The product is finely ground, compressed into pellets or blocks, flash frozen and then shipped for use as an additive.

Most of the finely textured beef is produced and sold by BPI, Cargill and Tyson Foods. As of March 2012 there was no labeling of the product, and only a USDA Organic label would have indicated that beef contained no "pink slime". Per BPI, the finished product is 94% to 97% lean beef (with a fat content of 3% to 6%) has a nutritional value comparable to 90% lean ground beef, is very high in protein, low in fat, and contains iron, zinc and B vitamins. Ammonia-treated LFTB typically contains 200 ppm of residual ammonia, compared to 101 ppm in conventional ground meat without LFTB. U.S. beef that contains up to 15% of the product can be labeled as "ground beef". Up to 2005, filler could make up to 25% of ground meat.

In an Associated Press review, food editor and cookbook author J. M. Hirsh compared the taste of two burgers: one containing LFTB and one traditional hamburger. He described the LFTB-containing burgers as smelling the same, but being less juicy and with not as much flavor. In 2002, a United States Department of Agriculture (USDA) microbiologist argued that the product contained connective tissue and that he did not consider it to be ground beef and that it was "not nutritionally equivalent" to ground beef. BPI claims no such connective tissue is used in their product. At least since 2004, USDA regulations disallow the use of connective tissue (see § Regulation below).

== Early use ==
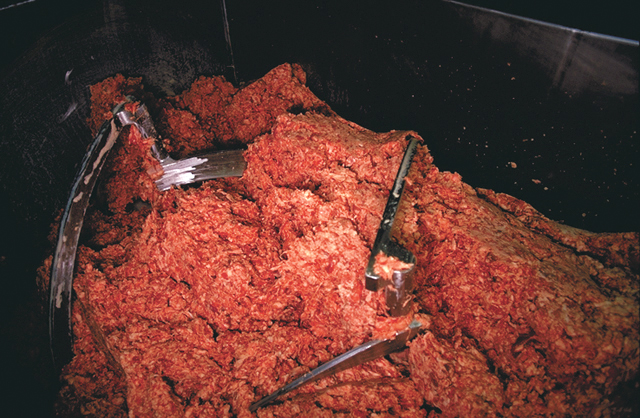
Ground beef that does not contain the LFTB additive, from a USDA image of a beef-grinding operation

In 1990, the USDA's Food Safety and Inspection Service (FSIS) approved the use of the technology for manufacturing finely textured meat. At the time of its approval, the FSIS called the remaining product "meat", although one FSIS microbiologist dissented, arguing it contained both muscle and connective tissue.

In 1994, in response to public health concerns over pathogenic E. coli in beef, the founder of BPI, Eldon Roth, began work on the "pH Enhancement System", which disinfects meat using injected anhydrous ammonia in gaseous form, rapid freezing to 28 °F (−2 °C), and mechanical stress.

In 2001, the FSIS approved the gaseous disinfection system as an intermediate step before the roller press freezer, and approved the disinfected product for human consumption, as an additive. The FSIS agreed with BPI's suggestion that ammonia was a "processing agent" which did not need to be listed on labels as an ingredient. FSIS microbiologists Carl Custer and Gerald Zirnstein stated that they argued against the product's approval for human consumption, saying that it was not "meat" but actually "salvage", and that the USDA should seek independent verification of its safety, but they were overruled. In 2003, BPI commissioned a study of the effectiveness and safety of the disinfection process; the Iowa State University researchers found no safety concern in the product or in ground beef containing it.

The term "pink slime", a reference to the product's "distinctive look", was coined in 2002 by Zirnstein in an internal FSIS e-mail. Expressing concern that ammonia should be mentioned on the labels of packaged ground beef to which the treated trimmings are added, Zirnstein stated "I do not consider the stuff to be ground beef, and I consider allowing it in ground beef to be a form of fraudulent labeling". He later stated that his main concern was that connective tissue is not "meat", and that ground beef to which the product had been added should not be called ground beef, since it is not nutritionally equivalent to regular ground beef.

In 2007, the USDA determined the disinfection process was so effective that it would be exempt from "routine testing of meat used in hamburger sold to the general public".

In December 2009, an investigative piece published by The New York Times questioned the safety of the meat treated by this process, pointing to occasions in which process adjustments were not effective. This article included the first public use of the term "pink slime" as a pejorative. In January 2010, The New York Times published an editorial reiterating the concerns posed in the news article while noting that no meat produced by BPI had been linked to any illnesses or outbreaks.

An episode of Jamie Oliver's Food Revolution aired on April 12, 2011, depicted Jamie Oliver decrying the use of "pink slime" in the food supply and in school lunches. In the episode, Oliver douses beef trimmings in liquid ammonia while explaining what the product is and why he is disgusted with it. Oliver stated, "Everyone who is told about 'pink slime' doesn't like it in their food—school kids, soldiers, senior citizens all hate it". The introduction of the additive into the nation's meat supply caused concern and was criticized by some scientists. "The scientists said they had used the term 'pink slime' to describe the product, which they said should have been identified as an additive and believed was not actually beef as it is commonly defined." The American Meat Institute and Beef Products Inc. retorted with a YouTube video featuring Dr. Gary Acuff of Texas A&M University questioning some of Oliver's statements and promoting the additive.

== ABC News report ==
An 11-segment series of reports in March 2012 from ABC News brought widespread public attention to and raised consumer concerns about the product. The product was described as "essentially scrap meat pieces compressed together and treated with an antibacterial agent". Lean finely textured beef (LFTB) was referred to as "an unappetizing example of industrialized food production". The product has been characterized as "unappetizing, but perhaps not more so than other things that are routinely part of hamburger" by Sarah Klein, an attorney for the food safety program at the Center for Science in the Public Interest. Nutritionist Andy Bellatti has referred to the product as "one of many symptoms of a broken food system". Food policy writer Tom Laskawy noted that ammonium hydroxide is only one of several chemicals routinely added to industrially produced meat in the United States.

It was reported at that time that 70% of ground beef sold in US supermarkets contained the additive, and that the USDA considered it as meat. The USDA issued a statement that LFTB was safe and had been included in consumer products for some time, and its Under Secretary of Agriculture for Food Safety Elisabeth A. Hagen stated that "The process used to produce LFTB is safe and has been used for a very long time. And adding LFTB to ground beef does not make that ground beef any less safe to consume".

=== Industry response ===
Manufacturer Beef Products Inc. (BPI) and meat industry organizations addressed public concerns by stating that the additive, though processed, is "lean beef" that simply was not able to be reclaimed through traditional slaughterhouse practices until newer technologies became available approximately 20 years ago. With regard to concerns over the use of ammonium hydroxide, BPI noted that its use as an anti-microbial agent is approved by the Food and Drug Administration. The use of ammonium hydroxide is included on the FDA's list of GRAS (generally recognized as safe) procedures, and is used in similar applications for numerous other food products, including puddings and baked goods.

=== Market response ===
Several U.S. food manufacturers publicly stated that they did not use the product in their wares, including ConAgra Foods Inc., Sara Lee Corporation and Kraft Foods Inc. Many meat retailers stated that they either did not use the product, or would cease using it.

Many fast food chains stopped use of the product after the controversy arose, or stated that they had not used the product before. In April 2012, the Concord Monitor reported increased business in some small neighborhood markets where the product's use was less likely, due to consumer concerns about the additive.

In March 2012, 70% of ground beef in the U.S. contained lean finely textured beef, and a year later, in March 2013, the amount was estimated by meat industry officials to be at approximately 5%. This significant reduction is due in part to the extensive media coverage that began in March 2012 about the additive. Kroger Co. and Supervalu Inc. stopped using the additive.

On March 25, 2012, BPI announced it would suspend operations at three of its four plants, being in "crisis planning". The three plants produced a total of about 900,000 pounds of the product per day. BPI said it lost contracts with 72 customers, many over the course of one weekend, and production decreased from 5 million pounds of LFTB per week to below one million pounds a week at the nadir (lowest point of production). Effective May 25, 2012, BPI closed three of its four plants, including one in Garden City, Kansas, lost more than $400 million in sales, and laid off 700 workers. Production decreased to less than 2 million pounds in 2013. Cargill also significantly cut production of finely textured beef and in April 2012 "warned [that] the public's resistance to the filler could lead to higher hamburger prices this barbecue season". About 80% of sales of the product evaporated "overnight" in 2012, per the president of Cargill Beef. Cargill stopped production in Vernon, California, and laid off about 50 workers as well as slowing production at other plants including a beef-processing plant in Plainview, Texas, where about 2,000 people were laid off.

Many grocery stores and supermarkets, including the nation's three largest chains, announced in March 2012 that they would no longer sell products containing the additive. Some grocery companies, restaurants and school districts discontinued the sale and provision of beef containing the additive after the media reports.

In April 2012, the USDA received requests from beef processors to allow voluntary labeling of products with the additive, and stated it planned to approve labeling after checks for label accuracy. Both BPI and Cargill made plans to label products that contain the additive to alleviate these concerns and restore consumer confidence. Following the USDA announcement to allow choices in purchasing decisions for ground beef, several school districts stated that they would opt out of serving ground beef with LFTB. By June 2012, 47 out of 50 U.S. states declined to purchase any of the product for the 2012–2013 school year while South Dakota Department of Education, Nebraska, and Iowa chose to continue buying it.

On April 2, 2012, AFA Foods, a ground-beef processor manufacturer of finely textured beef owned by Yucaipa Companies filed for Chapter 11 bankruptcy due to a reduction in demand for ground beef, which it blamed on media attention.

In early 2012, prices for cattle futures contracts on the Chicago Mercantile Exchange fell as result of the controversy.

Cargill started using a label stating "Contains Finely Textured Beef" from 2014. Production of finely textured beef increased modestly, as beef prices rose by 27% over two years in 2014 and "retailers [sought] cheaper trimmings to include in hamburger meat and processors find new products to put it in". Senior management of Cargill claimed almost full recovery as sales tripled. BPI regained 40 customers that are mostly processors and patty-makers who distribute to retailers and the USDA since March 2012. It does not label its product.

=== Government response ===
Following the suspension of operations at three out of four BPI plants, members of the media and leaders were invited by Iowa Governor Terry Branstad to tour the BPI facility that remained open in South Sioux City, Nebraska. The founders of BPI gave campaign contributions to Branstad in 2010, and to other candidates' campaigns. Branstad stated to ABC News that the contributions were not a factor in his decision regarding having the event. Texas Governor Rick Perry, Nebraska Lieutenant Governor Rick Sheehy, Kansas Governor Sam Brownback, and South Dakota Lieutenant Governor Matt Michels, toured the South Sioux City, Nebraska, plant in an attempt to allay "inaccurate information" that they stated as having caused "an unnecessary panic among consumers". The publicity tour emerged with the promotional slogan, "Dude, it's beef!" News reporters were not allowed to ask employees at BPI any questions during the tour. BPI asserts that social media and ABC News "grossly misrepresented" their product. BPI eventually sued ABC News for defamation. On March 28, 2012, Branstad stated, "The problem is, we take this off the market, then we end up with a fatter product that's going to cost more and it's going to increase the obesity problem in this country". Safeway and other retailers that have removed the product from their shelves or product lines have stated they will not raise the price of their beef. Branstad also stated that he would recommend that Iowa state public schools continue to use ground beef which contains the product, and stated plans to "send a letter to the state's public schools, encouraging them to continue to buy LFTB".

On March 22, 2012, 41 Democrats in Congress, led by Representative Chellie Pingree of Maine, wrote a letter to United States Secretary of Agriculture Tom Vilsack, head of the USDA, that "creating a two-tiered school lunch program where kids in less affluent communities get served this low-grade slurry is wrong" and urged its elimination from all public-school lunches. Senator Jon Tester of Montana issued a news release in March 2012 urging Agriculture Secretary Vilsack to remove "pink slime" from school lunches and replace it with "high-quality Montana beef". Tester stated he planned to include provisions in the upcoming farm bill that would allow schools more flexibility in using USDA commodity funds, to increase options in purchasing locally grown and produced foods.

In December 2018, lean finely textured beef was reclassified as "ground beef" by the Food Safety And Inspection Service of the United States Department Of Agriculture. This occurred after Beef Products Incorporated submitted new production processes and "a new product" to the Food Safety And Inspection Service, the agency determined that the product may be labeled as "ground beef".

=== School lunches ===
The reaction against the product has also been partially credited to a Change.org petition that has landed over a quarter million signatures to ban it in school meals. After some parents and consumer advocates insisted the product be removed from public schools, the USDA indicated, beginning in fall 2012, that it would give school districts the choice between ground beef with or without LFTB. CBS News reported that Chicago Public schools may have served "pink slime" in school lunches.

While some school districts have their own suppliers, many school districts purchase beef directly from the USDA and do not know what is in the beef. For the year 2012, the USDA planned on purchasing 7 million pounds of lean beef trimmings for the U.S. national school lunch program. USDA spokesman Mike Jarvis stated that of the 117 million pounds of beef ordered nationally for the school lunch program in the past year, 6% was LFTB. An analysis of California Department of Education data indicated that "anywhere from none to nearly 3 million pounds of beef from the USDA that was served in California schools last year could have contained lean finely textured beef". According to the USDA, the cost differential between ground beef with and without the additive has been estimated at approximately 3%.

=== BPI lawsuit ===
On September 13, 2012, BPI announced that it filed a $1.2 billion lawsuit, Beef Products, Inc. v. American Broadcasting Companies, Inc., against ABC News; three reporters (Diane Sawyer, Jim Avila and David Kerley) and others, claiming ABC News made nearly "200 false, misleading and defamatory statements, repeated continuously during a month-long disinformation campaign", engaged in "product and food disparagement, and tortious interference with business relationships". BPI called the ABC News series a "concerted disinformation campaign" against LFTB.

ABC News denied BPI's claims, and called the lawsuit without merit. ABC News sought to have the case removed from South Dakota state court to federal court. In June 2013, a federal judge sent the lawsuit back to state court. On March 27, 2014, South Dakota state court Judge Cheryle Gering rejected ABC's motion to dismiss, and allowed the defamation suit to move forward. Diane Sawyer's motion for summary judgment was granted and she was dismissed.

The trial of the case began June 5, 2017, in Elk Point, South Dakota. The trial, in a courthouse remodeled for the occasion, was expected to take 8 weeks, but was settled after three weeks. The court ruled that BPI is a public figure; thus, proof of "actual malice" is required to support a verdict of defamation. ABC was represented by Williams & Connolly, BPI by Winston & Strawn. South Dakota has a food disparagement law which may have permitted triple damages to $5.7 billion had there been a verdict for the plaintiff.

On June 28, 2017, ABC and BPI reached a settlement, ending the suit. Terms of the settlement were not disclosed. A Walt Disney earnings report indicated that the amount paid was at least $177 million.

== Regulation ==
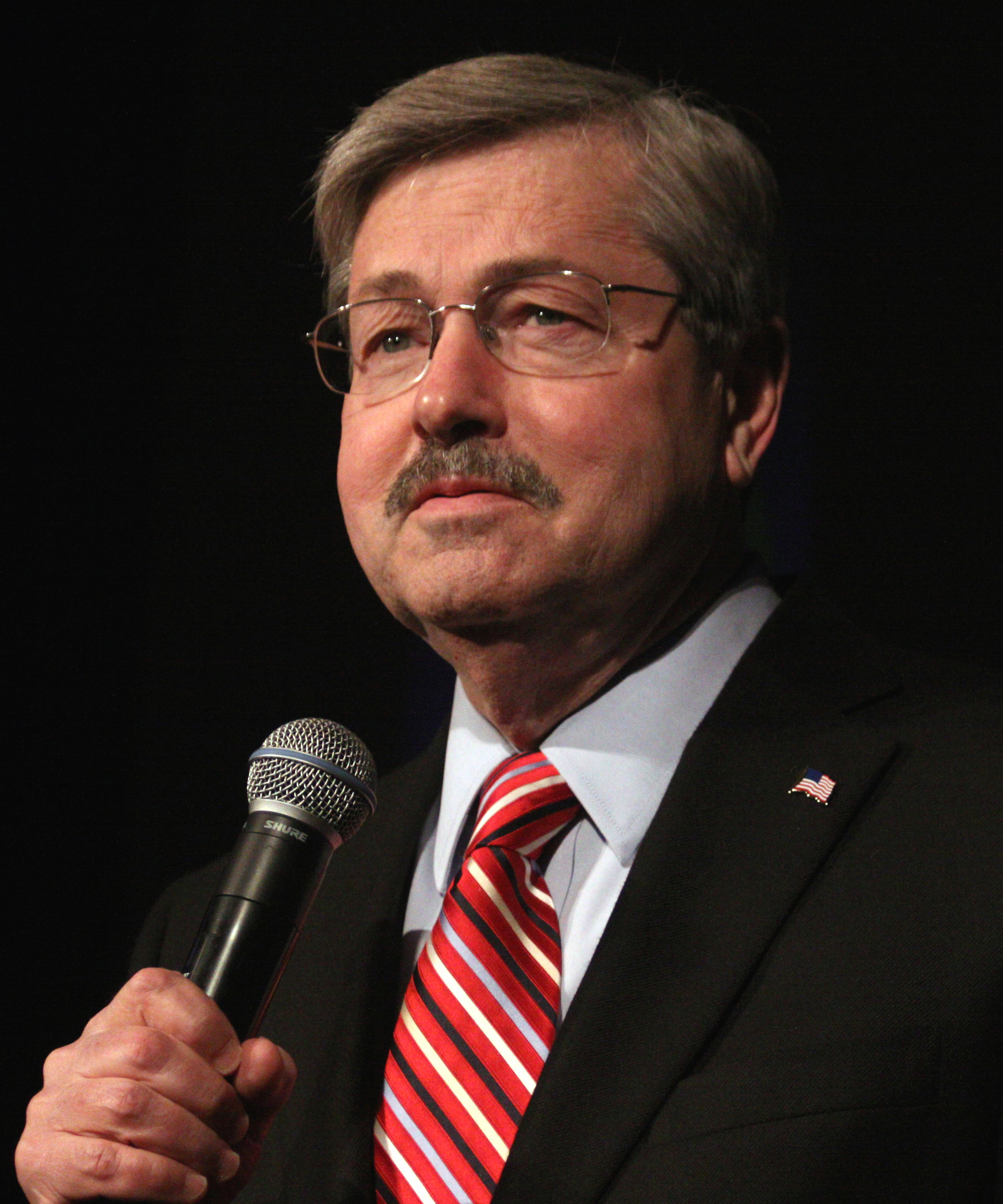
Former Iowa governor Terry Branstad, a supporter of the product's use in beef products

In the US, the additive is not for direct consumer sale. Lean finely textured beef can constitute up to 15% of ground beef without additional labeling, and it can be added to other meat products such as beef-based processed meats. USDA disallows the use of spinal cord, organ meat such as cow intestines, bones, and connective tissue such as tendons in LFTB. USDA requires the trimmings used to make LFTB to meet the same microbiological standards as other beef.

Because of ammonium hydroxide use in its processing, the lean finely textured beef by BPI is not permitted in Canada. Health Canada stated that: "Ammonia is not permitted in Canada to be used in ground beef or meats during their production" and may not be imported, as the Canadian Food and Drugs Act requires that imported meat products meet the same standards and requirements as domestic meat. Canada does allow Cargill's citric acid-produced Finely Textured Meat (FTM) to be "used in the preparation of ground meat" and "identified as ground meat" under certain conditions.

Production of mechanically separated meat via use of bones or bone-in cuts of bovine, ovine and caprine animals are prohibited in the European Union.

== Public perception ==
The nature of the product and the manner in which it is processed led to concerns that it might be a risk to human health. There have been no reported cases of foodborne illnesses due to consumption of the product. Among consumers, media reporting significantly reduced its acceptance as an additive to ground beef.

A Harris Interactive survey commissioned by Red Robin and released on April 4, 2012, found that 88% of US adults were aware of the "pink slime" issue, and that of those who were aware, 76% indicated that they were "at least somewhat concerned", with 30% "extremely concerned". 53% of respondents who stated that they were aware of pink slime took some action, such as researching ground beef they purchase or consume, or decreasing or eliminating ground beef consumption.

== Legislation ==
Some consumer advocacy groups pressed for pink slime's elimination or for mandatory disclosure of additives in beef, but a spokesperson from Beef Products Inc. at the time said there was no need for any additional labeling, asking "What should we label it? It's 100 percent beef, what do you want us to label it? I'm not prepared to say it's anything other than beef, because it's 100 percent beef".

Other consumer advocacy groups, notably the National Consumers League, expressed dismay at the popular reaction against the product, and especially the plant closures "because of business the company has lost to very serious misinformation, widely disseminated by the media, about its product, lean finely textured beef (LFTB)". Similarly, the Consumer Federation of America said the plant closures were "unfortunate" and expressed concern that the product might be replaced in ground beef with "something that has not been processed to assure the same level of safety". U.S. consumers have expressed concerns that ground beef which contains the product is not labeled as such, and that consumers are currently unable to make informed purchasing decisions due to this lack of product labeling. Senator Bob Menendez of New Jersey, Democrats called upon the USDA to institute mandatory labeling guidelines for ground beef sold in supermarkets, so consumers can make informed purchasing decisions.

== See also ==
- 2013 horse meat scandal
- Advanced meat recovery
- Ag-gag
- Animal product
- Beef hormone controversy
- Food libel laws
- Mechanically separated meat
- Reconstituted meat
- Transglutaminase
