= Skunk oil =

Oil from skunk glands

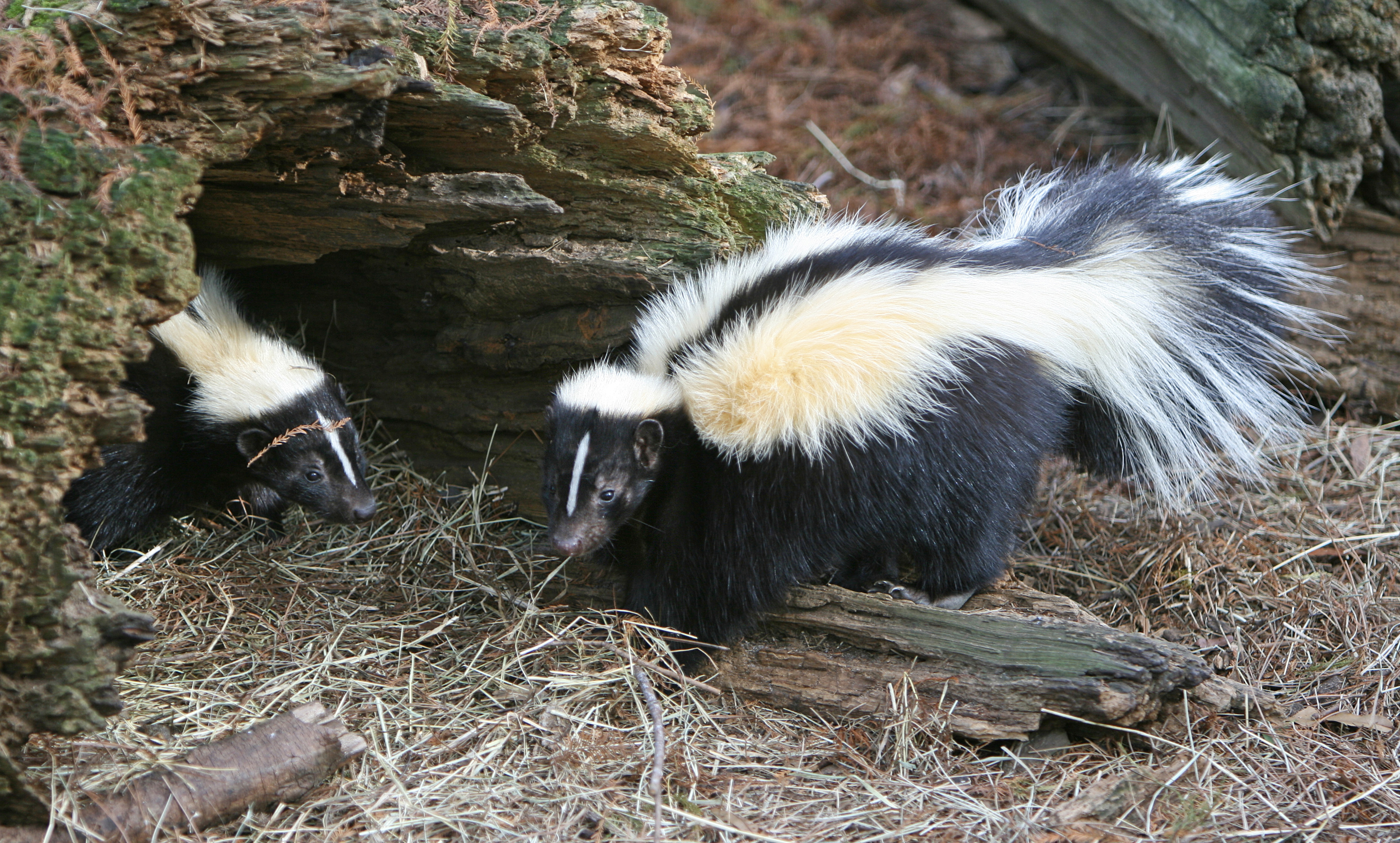
Skunk oil is obtained from skunks

Skunk oil, also referred to as skunk grease, is an oil that is obtained from the two lateral glands that run the length of a skunk's back. Skunks store fat in these glands for use during hibernation or semi-hibernation in warmer climates. Skunk oil has minimal odor.

== Uses ==
Skunk oil was used by the Native Americans as a healing balm or liniment. The Mi'kmaq of Nova Scotia, Canada, reportedly mixed skunk oil with oil from the red squirrel to produce an ingestible concoction that induced vomiting and relieved whooping cough. Skunk oil has been used as traditional medicine in Mexico, and is still widely used in Mexico and the U.S.

When rendered from the glands over a low heat, it has the consistency of an SAE10 motor oil and the feel of coal oil when applied to the skin. The substance produces a mild warming sensation when applied, similar as that of liniments.

Skunk oil was, according to later recounts, a not uncommon remedy used by frontiersmen in parts of the northern USA in the late 19th century. It was used against severe colds by rubbing it on the chest in combination with the ingestion of warm herbal teas.

The early explorers and fur buyers, especially in Canada, found that the oil was a very useful addition to their medical kits and paid the natives a premium price for it.

It is also used in the United States as a way for deer hunters to mask their human odor while hunting.

== Production ==
In the late 19th century and early 20th century, some self-sufficient farmers in North America would produce skunk oil as a home remedy. One way to produce skunk oil was to boil the fat of several skunks and add a couple of tablespoons of male skunk glandular secretion before the oil coagulated. The oil, once cooled, could be stored in a jar for years.

Around the year 1900, the state of Maine had produced about 25,000 gallons of the oil annually which had sold for about $4/gallon.

== See also ==
- Musk
