= Emu oil =

Oil derived from emu body fat

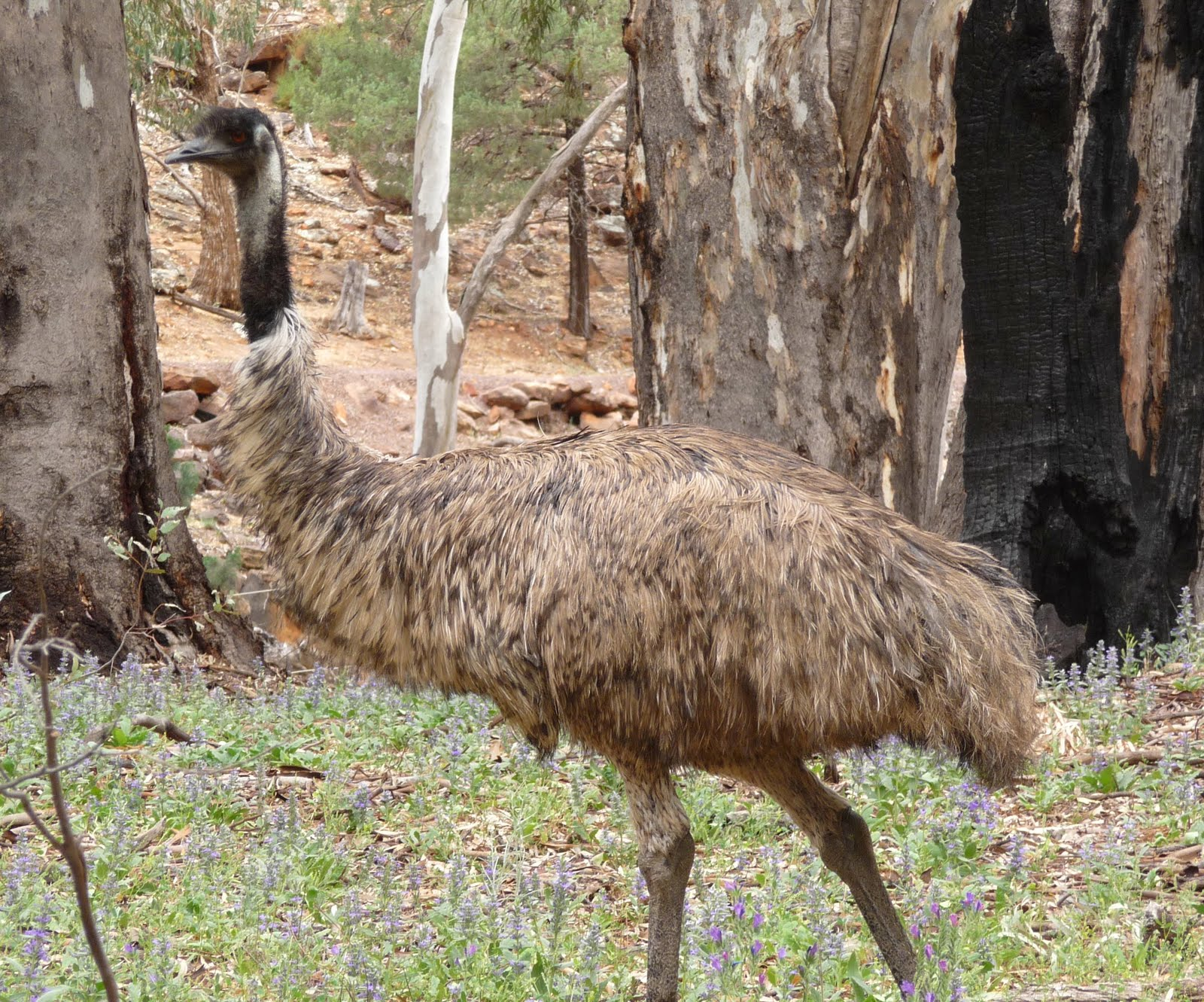
An emu, the source of emu oil

Emu oil is an oil derived from body fat harvested from certain subspecies of the emu, Dromaius novaehollandiae, a flightless bird indigenous to Australia, and used in Aboriginal and Alternative medicine.

Unadulterated emu oil can vary widely in colour and viscosity anywhere from an off-white creamy texture to a thin yellow liquid, depending on the diet of the emu and the refining method(s) used. Industrially refined emu oil is composed of a minimum of 70% unsaturated fatty acids. The largest component is oleic acid, a monounsaturated omega-9 fatty acid. Emu oil also contains roughly 20% linoleic acid (an omega-6 fatty acid) and 1–2% linolenic acid (an omega-3 fatty acid). Fully refined emu oil has a bland flavour.

Emu oil has previously been wrongly promoted as a dietary supplement with the claim it can treat a variety of human ailments, including cancer and arthritis.

== Research ==
Since 2015 two small human studies have been done, one for use as a skin moisturiser and the other for use as an insect repellent.

Commercial emu oil supplements are not standardised and vary widely in their potency. The US Food and Drug Administration highlighted emu oils in a 2009 article on "How to Spot Health Fraud", pointing out that many "pure emu oil" products are unapproved drugs.

== See also ==
- Snake oil
- Ostrich oil
- List of ineffective cancer treatments
