= Ostrich meat =

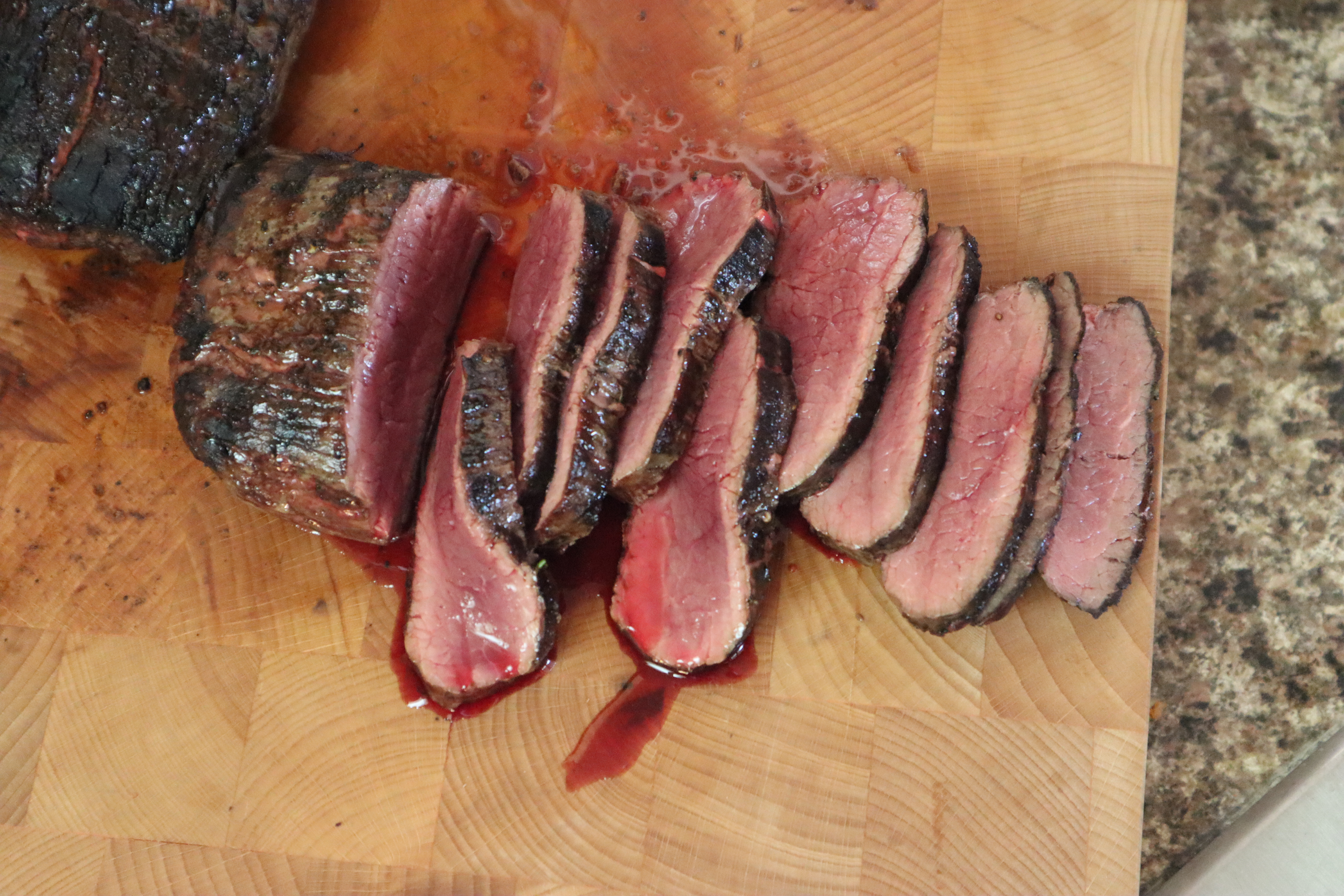
Slices of cooked ostrich meat

Ostrich meat is meat obtained from the ostrich, a large flightless bird native to Africa. While it is red in appearance, nutritional scientists do not classify it as red meat because it does not come from a mammal. Known for its health benefits and sustainability, ostrich meat has gained popularity worldwide, particularly in health-conscious and gourmet markets. It tends to be darker than beef due to the high levels of final pH.

== History ==
Ostrich medallions, served in a restaurant in Sandton (Johannesburg), South Africa

The consumption of ostrich meat dates back to ancient times, particularly in Africa where ostriches are native. The meat was traditionally hunted and consumed by various indigenous cultures. In the late 19th and early 20th centuries, ostrich farming began to spread to other parts of the world, including North America, Europe, and Australia, primarily driven by the demand for ostrich feathers. Today, ostrich meat is farmed commercially in various parts of the world, including the United States, South Africa, and Australia. Consumers can purchase ostrich meat in the United States from a few of the current ostrich farms including Amaroo Hills, American Ostrich Farms, Blackwing, Briardale, and Salgers.

== Nutritional benefits ==
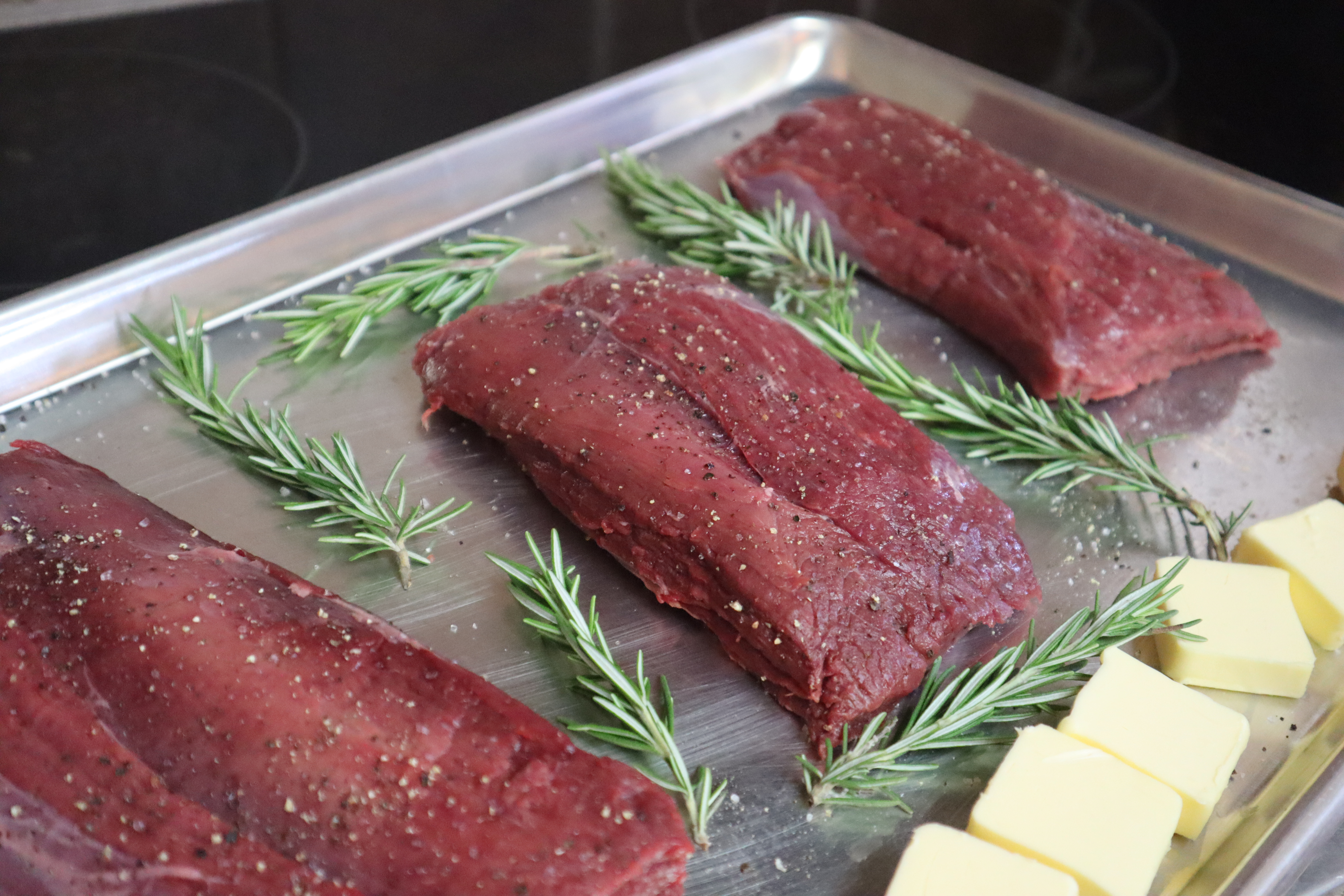
raw ostrich filet

Ostrich meat is highly valued for its nutritional profile. It is a lean meat, with low fat content and high protein. The meat has lower cholesterol levels than beef, pork, and lamb. Ostrich meat is a good source of iron, which is essential for red blood cell production. It contains significant amounts of B vitamins, particularly B12, which is important for energy metabolism and nervous system health.

== See also ==
- Ostrich
- Ostrich egg
- Ostrich oil
- Sustainable agriculture
