= Mechanically separated meat =

Paste-like meat product

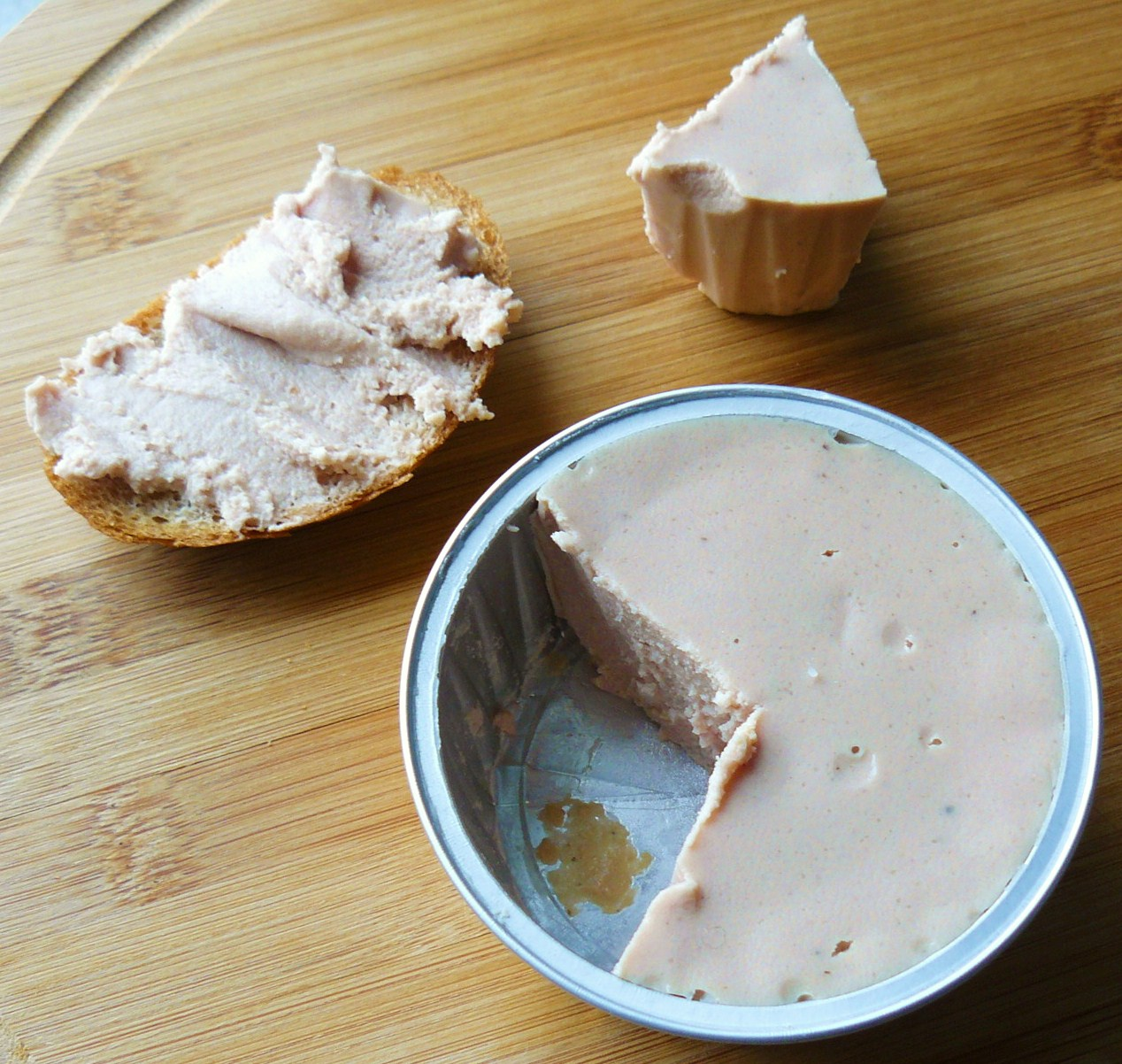
Mechanically separated meat: pasztet

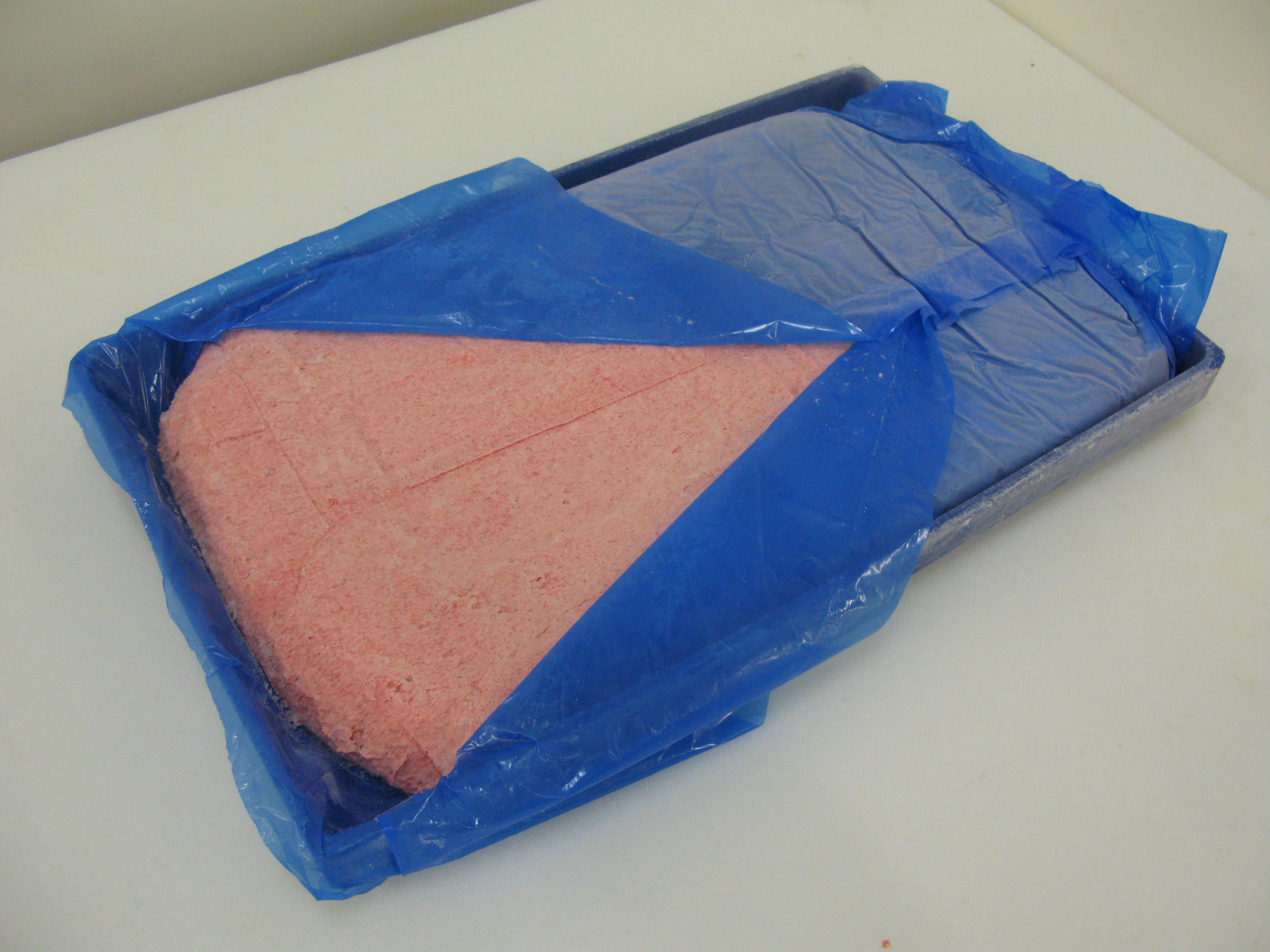
Mechanically deboned meat: frozen chicken

Mechanically separated meat (MSM), mechanically recovered/reclaimed meat (MRM), or mechanically deboned meat (MDM) is a paste-like meat product produced by forcing pureed or ground beef, pork, mutton, turkey or chicken under high pressure through a sieve or similar device to separate the bone from the edible meat tissue. When poultry is used, it is sometimes called white slime as an analog to meat-additive pink slime and to meat extracted by advanced meat recovery systems, both of which are different processes. The process entails pureeing or grinding the carcass left after the manual removal of meat from the bones and then forcing the slurry through a sieve under pressure.

The resulting product is a blend primarily consisting of tissues not generally considered meat, along with a much smaller amount of actual meat (muscle tissue). In some countries such as the United States, these non-meat materials are processed separately for human and non-human uses and consumption.

Mechanically separated meat has been used in certain meat and meat products, such as hot dogs and bologna sausage, since the late 1960s. However, not all such meat products are manufactured using an MSM process.

== Safety and regulation ==
=== United States ===
In the United States, mechanically separated poultry has been used in poultry products since 1969, after the National Academy of Sciences found it safe. Questions about safety arose in the 1980s, leading to a 1982 report by the U.S. Food Safety and Inspection Service (FSIS) which concluded that mechanically separated meat is safe and established a standard of identity. The standard of identity puts a cap on the concentration of calcium, which indicates the presence of bone. It also limits the maximum size of bone particles, the maximum fat content (and its peroxidation value), and the minimum amount of protein and essential amino acids. Mechanically separated meat can only be used in a limited number of products (hot dogs are allowed, but hamburgers are not), which may contain up to 20% MSM under the 1982 rule, and must be clearly labeled.

In 1995, a U.S. Department of Agriculture-FSIS "final rule" (see 60 FR 55962, 60 FR 55982–3) established separate standards for mechanically separated poultry and other meat. Mechanically separated poultry still has calcium content and bone size limits, but no longer any limits on fat and protein levels. It is now considered safe to use without restriction on proportion, but still needs to be labeled clearly. The rule took effect in 1996.

Significant restrictions were later placed on mechanically separated beef due to concerns about bovine spongiform encephalopathy (BSE), commonly known as "mad cow disease". Ultimately, products with mechanically separated beef have been prohibited for human consumption since 2004.

Due to FSIS regulations enacted in 2004 to protect consumers against bovine spongiform encephalopathy, mechanically separated beef is considered inedible and is prohibited for use as human food. It is not permitted in hot dogs or any other processed product.

=== European Union/United Kingdom ===
Concerns over BSE first arose in 1986 in the United Kingdom. Since mechanically separated beef often contained small amounts of spinal cord tissue, which can carry the BSE prion, consuming mechanically separated meat from bovine carcasses carried an increased risk of transmitting BSE to humans. The EU tightened restrictions multiple times starting in 1989, to decrease the risk of spinal cord tissue getting into mechanically separated bovine meat. In the mid-1990s the UK banned mechanically separated meat from cattle backbone, which was expanded to include backbone from any ruminant in 1998 (under European Commission Decision 97/534/EC), and any ruminant bone in 2001. In 2004, under Regulation (EC) No 853/2004, MSM from all ruminants was banned for human consumption.

As of 1997, the European Union regulates MSM by the source material, fat (and peroxidation value), protein, and calcium content, bone particle sizes, and by how it is produced and stored. Since 2010, the European Union distinguishes between low-pressure MSM and high-pressure MSM. "Low pressure" MSM is produced by advanced meat recovery (AMR) and is similar to mince meat in terms of appearance and the extent of muscle fiber damage. In a conventional high-pressure process, the meat is pressed through a sieve and the result is the typical paste. High-pressure MSM comes with more risk of microbial growth. However, if European regulations are followed (high-pressure MSM must be immediately frozen and can only be used in cooked products), there is no additional risk compared to conventional meat products. Low-pressure MSM corresponds to the class of AMR meat in US regulation, while high-pressure MSM corresponds to the class of MSM.

== See also ==
- Forcemeat
- Potted meat
- Specified risk material (SRM)
