= Pearl powder =

Preparation of crushed pearls

Pearl powder (Chinese: 珍珠粉; pinyin: zhēnzhū fěn) is a preparation of crushed pearls used in China and elsewhere for skin care and in traditional Chinese medicine.

== Preparation ==
Pearl powder is made from freshwater pearls or saltwater pearls below jewellery grade. These are sterilised in boiling water and then milled into a fine powder using stainless steel grinding discs or by milling with small porcelain balls in moist conditions. The powder is sold as such or mixed into creams.

== Uses ==
=== Cosmetic ===
Pearl powder is widely believed to help improve the appearance of the skin, and is used as a cosmetic by royal families in Asia. It is also used as a treatment for acne. Some studies have claimed that pearl powder can stimulate the skin's fibroblasts, help regenerate collagen, and accelerate healing of certain skin conditions, wounds, and burns.

=== Medical ===
Pearl powder contains a number of amino acids, over 30 trace minerals, and a high concentration of calcium. In Chinese medicine, it is used as an anti-inflammatory and detoxification agent, and as a relaxant.

The calcium content is considered beneficial for calcium deficient persons with issues such as osteoporosis. A typical dose is 1 gram of pearl powder taken by mouth, traditionally mixed into water or tea, twice weekly. Excessive doses may cause calcium toxicity.

The powder is also used to treat stomach and intestinal conditions such as indigestion and chronic constipation. It is claimed to minimize pain from sores and ulcers, and to help reduce the sores and ulcers themselves.

== History ==
=== China ===
The use in China of pearl powder, both as medicine and as cosmetic, dates back at least to 320 AD. Pearl powder was an ingredient in traditional Chinese medicine (TCM), in the treatment of eye diseases, tuberculosis and to prevent heart attacks. The empress Wu Ze Tian (625 AD – 705 AD) used pearl powder internally and on her skin. The medical book Bencao Gangmu of the Ming dynasty claimed that pearl can stimulate new skin growth and healing, release toxins, and remove sun damage and age spots.

=== India ===
Pearl powder was also used in Ayurvedic medicine in the Indian subcontinent. Narahari, a physician of Kashmir, wrote in about 1240 that the pearl was an antidote to poisons, cured conditions of the eyes, consumption and "morbid disturbances", and increased general strength and health. Powdered pearl was also an ingredient of love potions. An Indian pharmacological work published in 1903 listed the powder as a tonic, stimulant and aphrodisiac.

=== Philippines ===
In the Philippines, from pre-colonial times, selected youths called binukot are special type of princes and princesses that were kept in seclusion and hidden from the sun in order to have fair and white skin. The binukot were fed crushed pearl powders to enhance the fairness and luminosity of their skin. Crushed pearl powder was also applied to their face and body to make their skin more pale and firm.

=== Europe ===
In medieval Europe, pearl powder was widely perceived to have therapeutic qualities. It was used in an attempt to treat the insanity of Charles VI of France (1368–1422), and the fever of which Lorenzo de Medici died in 1492. Seventeenth-century German and English works claimed its effectiveness in a wide range of physical and mental conditions. Francis Bacon (1561–1626) recommended it as a means of prolonging life. Pearl powder was also used as a skin whitener by women in Europe during the nineteenth century; one work, however, deprecated it as imparting a "pale, sickly hue", as well as being injurious to the skin and general health.

== Sources ==
- George Frederick Kunz & Charles Hugh Stevenson (1908), "The Book of the Pearl: Its History, Art, Science, and Industry", Courier Corporation. ISBN 9780486422763
