= Advanced meat recovery =

Process of maximizing removal of meat from a carcass

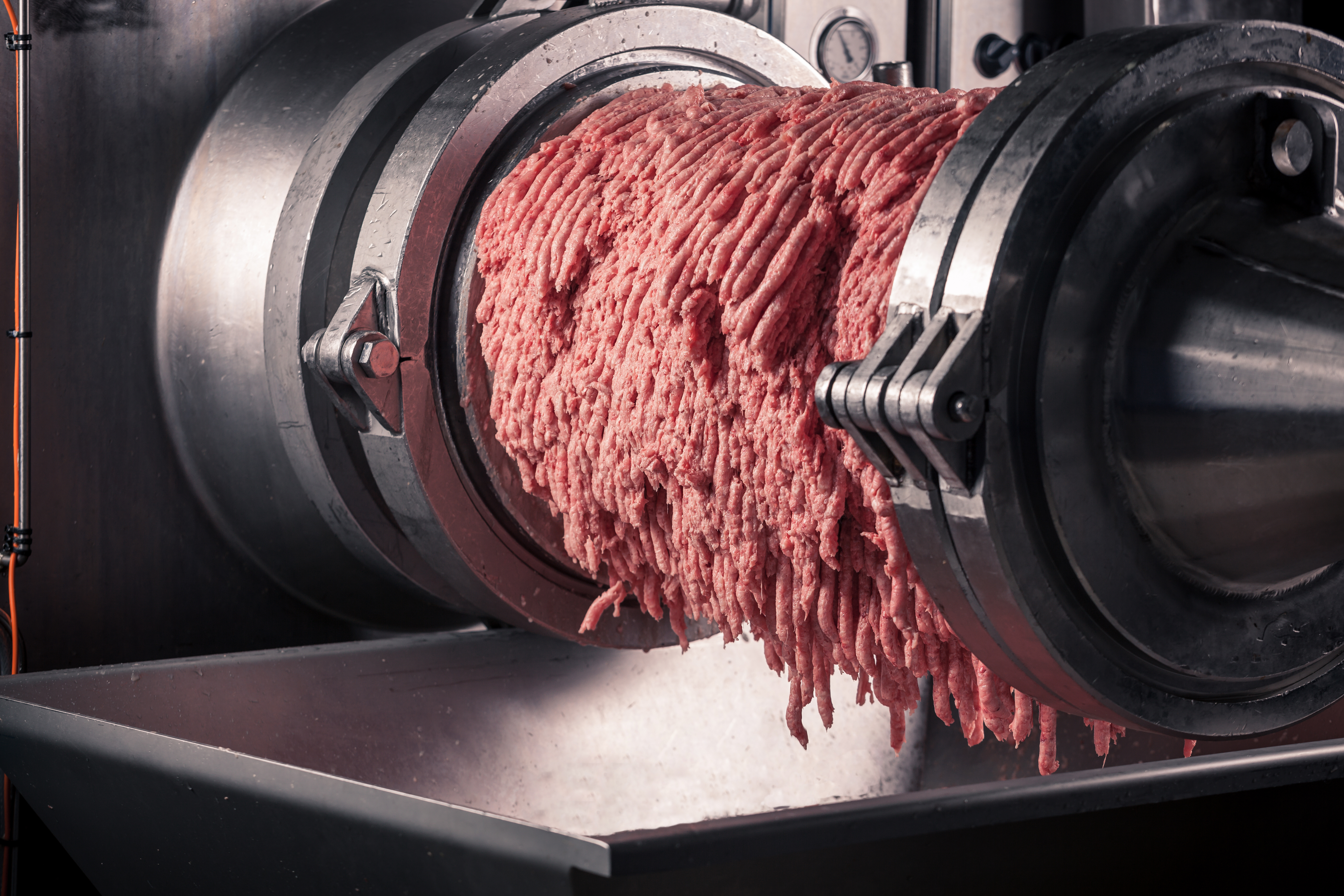
Low-pressure meat separator processing chicken.

Advanced meat recovery (AMR) is a slaughterhouse deboning process by which the last traces of skeletal muscle meat are removed from animal bones after the primal cuts have been carved off manually. The machinery used in this process separates meat from bone by scraping, shaving, or pressing the meat from the bone without breaking or grinding the bone. AMR meat typically is used as an ingredient in products requiring further processing, such as hot dogs. Unlike mechanically separated meat, AMR meat is comparable in appearance, texture, and composition to meat trimmings and similar meat products derived by hand.

In the US, products produced by advanced meat recovery machinery can be labeled using terms associated with hand-deboned product (i.e., "beef", "pork", "beef trimmings", etc.). USDA regulations for procurement of frozen fresh ground beef products state that "Beef that is mechanically separated from bone with automatic deboning systems, advanced lean (meat) recovery (AMR) systems or powered knives, will not be allowed".

The equivalent technology is known as "low pressure mechanical meat separation" in the European Union, and its product governed as a subset of mechanically separated meat. The product was formerly known as desinewed meat (DSM).

== Regulation ==
=== In the United States ===
In the United States, USDA regulations stipulate that AMR machinery cannot grind, crush, or pulverize bones to remove edible meat tissue, and bones must emerge intact. The meat produced in this manner can contain no more than 150(±30) milligrams of calcium per 100 grams product, as calcium in such high concentrations in the product would be indicative of bone being mixed with the meat. Products that exceed the calcium content limit must instead be labeled "mechanically separated beef or pork" in the ingredients statement.

In 1994, the Food Safety and Inspection Service (FSIS) issued a rule allowing such meat to be labeled as meat for human consumption, providing that the bones from which it was removed were still intact after processing. In 1997, following tests indicating that central nervous system (CNS) tissue was showing up in mechanically removed meat, FSIS issued a directive to its inspectors instructing them to ensure that spinal cord tissue was removed from bones before the AMR process. Following the identification of a BSE-infected U.S. dairy cow in December 2003, FSIS issued new regulations expanding the definition of prohibited CNS tissue to include additional cattle parts. AMR-processed product from cattle more than 30 months old, and ones containing CNS material from any livestock species were also prohibited from being used for food.

The USDA's AMR guidelines restrict the processing of the parts of cattle that may contain central nervous tissue from AMR systems in cattle over 30 months of age. However, non-CNS tissue meat can be processed and is considered meat, as are the muscle cuts. Although some sources claim AMR systems use ammonia (or anhydrous ammonia, ammonia hydroxide, etc.) to treat the meat, this appears to be due to confusion between AMR and the production of lean finely textured beef (LFTB, commonly referred to as pink slime). LFTB is in fact treated with ammonia, and so is substantially more restricted than most AMR products.

=== In Europe ===
Prior to 2012, desinewed meat (DSM) could be called "meat" in the UK. In 2012, European Commission reclassified DSM as a kind of mechanically recovered meat (MRM). The downgrade of DSM took effect in the UK in May 2012. Unlike other types of MRM, which have the appearance of a paste, DSM resembled minced meat.

The new regulation treats DSM as "low-pressure mechanically separated meat". As a result, many of the regulations governing conventional (high-pressure, paste) MSM/MRM apply, including the 2004 ban on MSM produced from ruminants. However, low-pressure MSM is still subject to looser rules in recognition of the lower microbial risk. While high-pressure MSM needs to be frozen immediately after production, low-pressure MSM only needs to be chilled. Low pressure MSM is also allowed in some uncooked products, while high-pressure MSM is not.

== See also ==
- Mechanically separated meat (MSM)
- Specified risk material (SRM)
- Ground meat
