= Alternative uses for placenta =

Other uses of Placenta

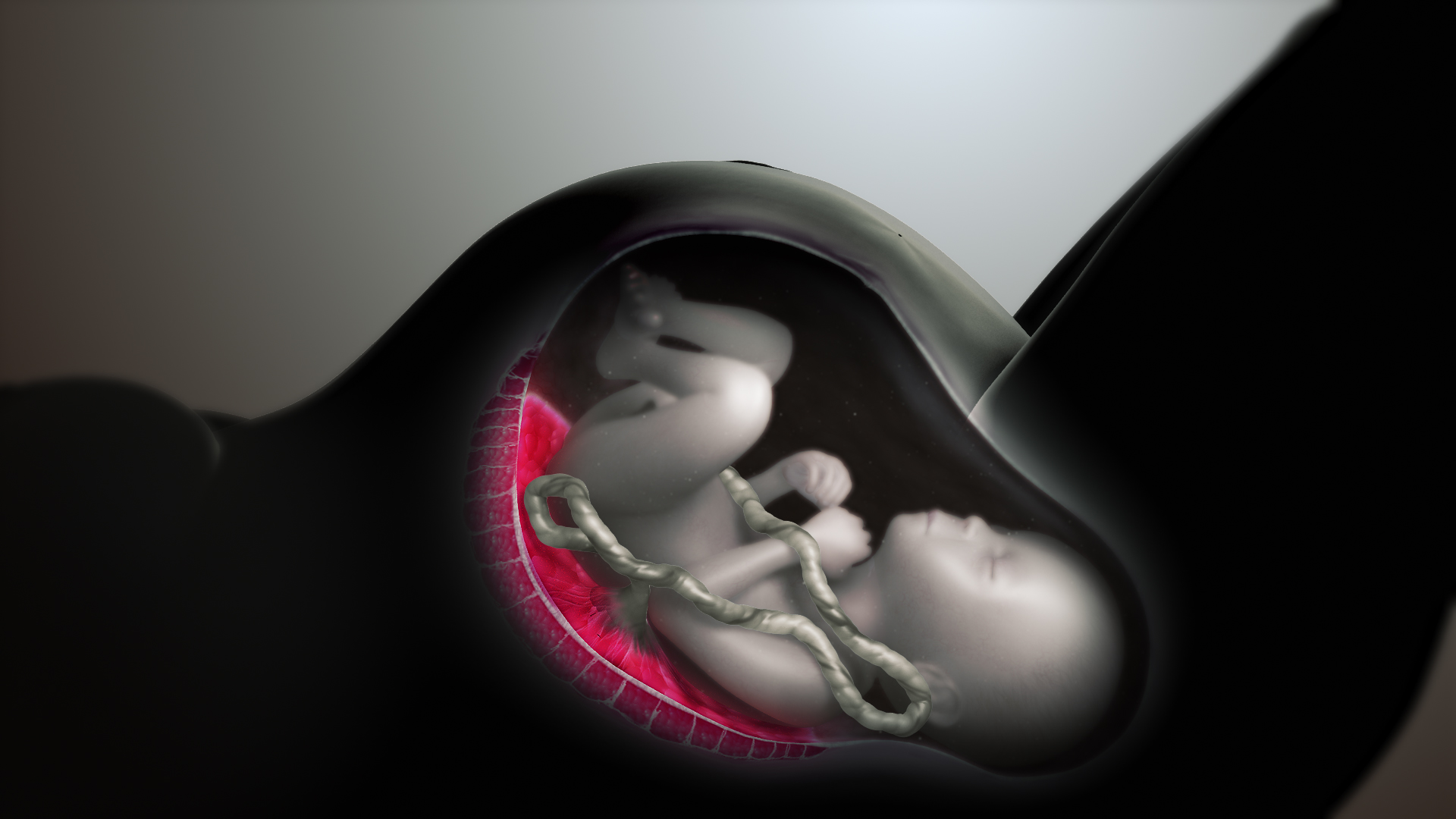
Placenta

The placenta is an organ which links the fetus to the mother in mammals for the transfer of oxygen and nutrients to the fetus and fetal waste products to the mother. Many species of mammals consume their placentas. Placentas are consumed in some human cultures. This may be for nutrition but often it has a cultural significance. For more information about the ritual consumption of placenta see Placenta: Society and culture. Human and animal placentas are also used as a source of extracts for ingredients in various consumer products such as pharmaceuticals, cosmetics, hair care products, health tonics, and food products other than ritual consumption by the mother or family. Human placentas are also used by search and rescue teams to train their search and rescue dogs to detect human remains.

== Use in cosmetics ==
At least three companies currently sell hair or skin treatments which contain extracts of animal placenta. The most common type of placenta used is sheep. The placental extract allegedly serves as a source of protein and hormones, predominantly estrogen and progesterone, in the cosmetics in which it is used. The purpose of the placenta extract is not well documented, and information is difficult to find.

The FDA maintains that placenta extract may be hazardous and its use is subject to restrictions and requirements of warnings in at least some products.

In one study, four girls between one and eight years of age developed breasts or pubic hair two to 24 months after starting to use hair products that contained estrogen or placenta extract. Their breasts and pubic hair regressed when they stopped using the products. No other cause for early sexual development was noted.

== Use in pharmaceuticals ==
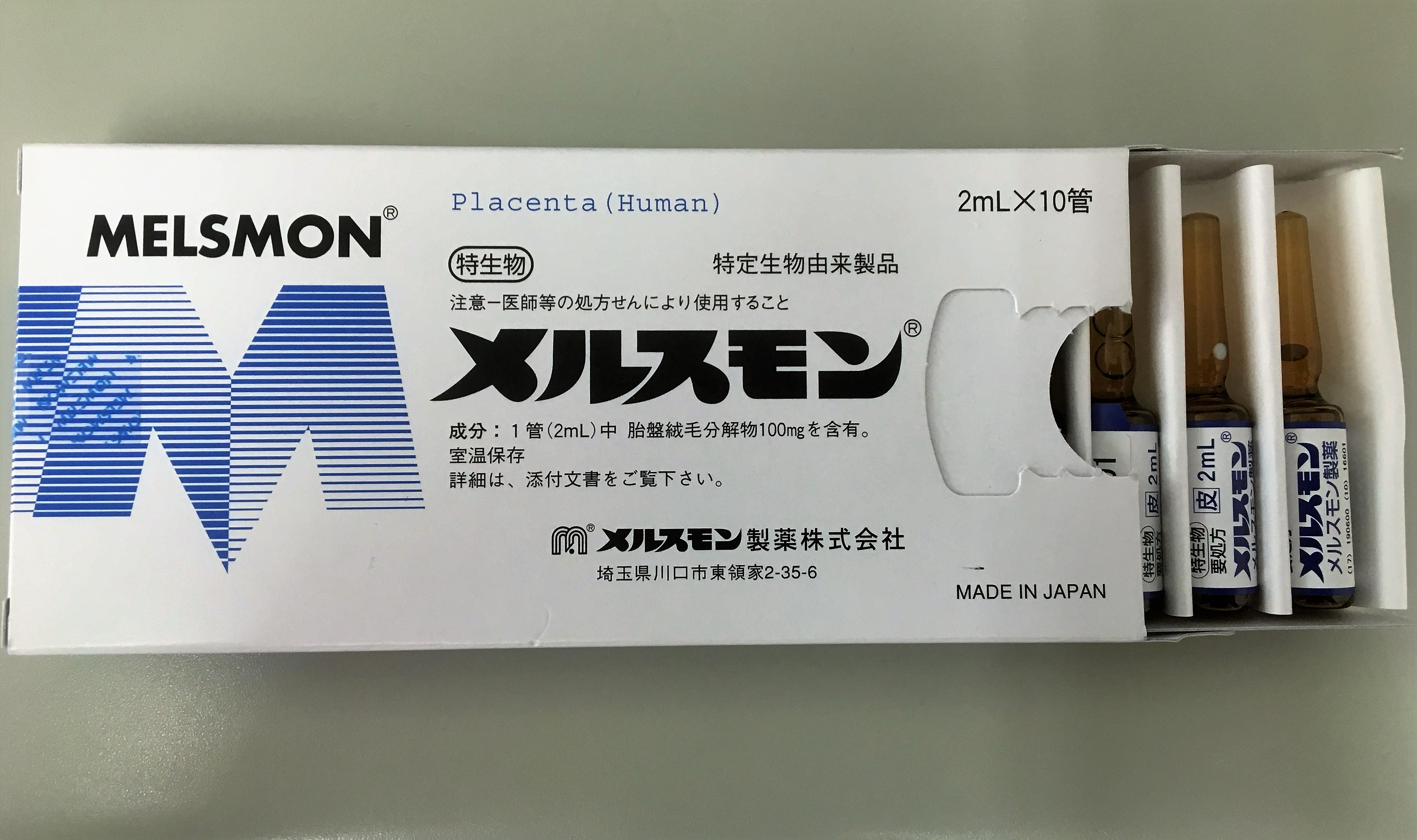
Melsmon

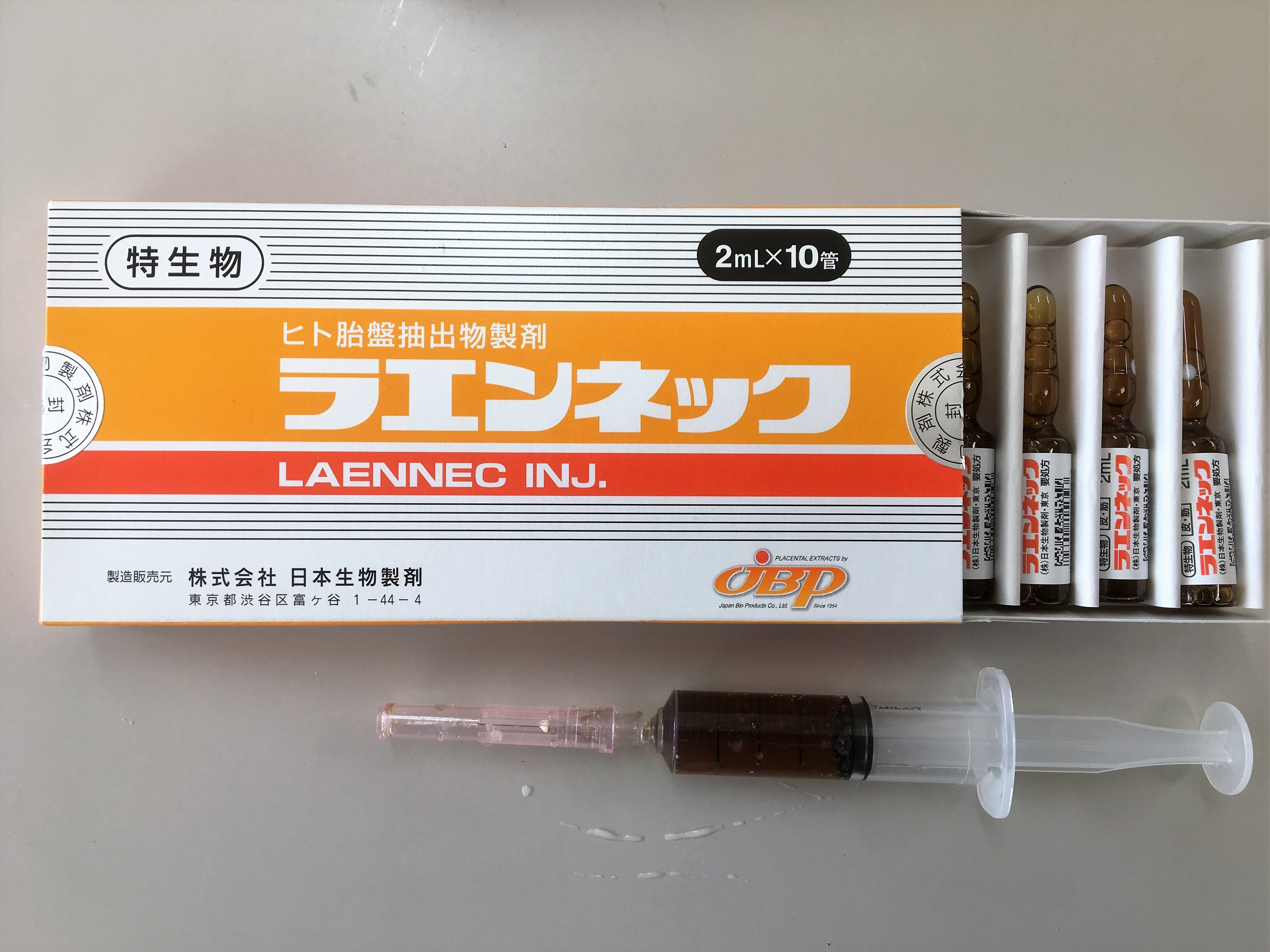
LAENNEC

=== Medical use ===
Melsmon Pharmaceutical Co. is a registered pharmaceutical company in Japan, in operation since 1956, that produces pharmaceutical grade placenta extracts from human placenta. The indication is to treat menopause. Laennec, another placenta extract formulation, is prescribed to treat chronic hepatitis. In case of chronic atrophic rhinitis placenta extract is injected to the nasal submucosa. Albert David Limited a Pharmaceutical company from India also manufactures an Injection from fresh human Placenta called Inj.Placentrex. 2 ml.

Hormone replacement therapy containing estrogen, while protective against osteoporosis, has been found to increase the risk of venous emboli and breast cancer. As such, the medical community uses hormone replacement therapy only in specific circumstances.

== Use in food ==
There are a number of foods, many with touted health benefits, that use placenta as an ingredient. This is in addition to ritual consumption by mothers and families in many cultures.

Plantec Co. in Japan makes a drink called "Placenta Drink" which contains placenta. The company claims that "It is a drink that used the placenta raw material" [sic] and "The expectation that makes the body metabolism active can be done" [sic] and "It is a drink of the apple taste" [sic].
