= List of infections of the central nervous system =

Infections of the central nervous system (CNS) consist of infections primarily of the brain and spinal cord. They include mostly viral infections, less commonly bacterial infections, fungal infections, prion diseases and protozoan infections. Neonatal meningitis is a particular classification by age.

== By anatomical site ==
- Brain abscess, Epidural abscess, including spinal epidural and cranial epidural
- Encephalitis
- Meningitis

== By cause ==
There are five main causes of CNS infections, namely bacterial, viral, fungal, protozoal, protozoan infections and prionic infections.

=== Viral ===
- Most forms of aseptic meningitis are viral in origin, though neoplastic and Lyme disease meningitis are also aseptic.
- California encephalitis virus
- Central nervous system viral disease
- Cytomegalovirus encephalitis
- SARS-CoV-2
- Eastern equine encephalitis
- Enterovirus encephalitis
- Epstein–Barr virus encephalitis
- Herpes simplex encephalitis
- Influenza encephalitis
- Japanese encephalitis
- La Crosse encephalitis
- Lymphocytic choriomeningitis by arenavirus
- Measles encephalitis
- Mumps
- Nipah virus encephalitis
- Poliomyelitis
- Progressive rubella panencephalitis, a late complication of congenital rubella syndrome
- St. Louis encephalitis
- Slow virus infections, which include:
  - Acquired immunodeficiency syndrome (AIDS)
  - Subacute sclerosing panencephalitis by Measles virus
  - Progressive multifocal leukoencephalopathy
- Rabies
- Tick-borne encephalitis
- Varicella
- Viral encephalitis lists 37 causes
- Viral meningitis
- Western equine encephalitis

=== Prionic ===
These are transmissible spongiform encephalopathies like:

- Bovine spongiform encephalopathy in cattle
- Chronic wasting disease in deer
- Creutzfeldt–Jakob disease and its variant
- Gerstmann–Sträussler–Scheinker syndrome
- Kuru
- Scrapie in sheep and goat
- Transmissible mink encephalopathy
- Variably protease-sensitive prionopathy

=== Fungal ===
- Cryptococcal meningitis

=== Protozoan ===
- Amoebic brain abscess
- Granulomatous amoebic encephalitis
- Malaria
- Primary amoebic meningoencephalitis
- Toxoplasmosis

=== Post-infectious diseases of the central nervous system ===
These are not infections but post-infectious CNS diseases:

- Acute disseminated encephalomyelitis
- Guillain–Barré syndrome
- PANDAS (controversial hypothesis)
- Sydenham's chorea

== See also ==
- Neuroepidemiology
- Neurovirology
