= Human pathogen =

Organism that causes disease in humans

A human pathogen is a pathogen (microbe or microorganism such as a virus, bacterium, prion, or fungus) that causes disease in humans.

The spread of human pathogens can be described using the chain of infection. The human physiological defense against common pathogens (such as Pneumocystis) is mainly the responsibility of the immune system with help by some of the body's normal microbiota. However, if the immune system or "good" microbiota are damaged in any way (such as by chemotherapy, human immunodeficiency virus (HIV), or antibiotics being taken to kill other pathogens), pathogenic bacteria that were being held at bay can proliferate and cause harm to the host. Such cases are called opportunistic infections.

Some pathogens (such as the bacterium Yersinia pestis, which may have caused the Black Plague, the Variola virus, and the malaria protozoa) have been responsible for massive numbers of casualties and have had numerous effects on affected groups. Of particular note in modern times is HIV, which is known to have infected several million humans globally, along with the influenza virus. Today, while many medical advances have been made to safeguard against infection by pathogens, through the use of vaccination, antibiotics, and fungicide, pathogens continue to threaten human life. Social advances such as food safety, hygiene, and water treatment have reduced the threat from some pathogens.

== Types ==
=== Viral ===
Pathogenic viruses are mainly those of the families of: Adenoviridae, Picornaviridae, Herpesviridae, Hepadnaviridae, Coronaviridae, Flaviviridae, Retroviridae, Orthomyxoviridae, Paramyxoviridae, Papovaviridae, Polyomavirus, Poxviridae, Rhabdoviridae, and Togaviridae. Some notable pathogenic viruses cause smallpox, influenza, mumps, measles, chickenpox, ebola, and rubella. Viruses typically range between 20 and 300 nanometers in length.

This type of pathogen is not cellular; instead a protein shell (the capsid) encases either RNA (Ribonucleic acid) or DNA (Deoxyribonucleic acid). Pathogenic viruses infiltrate host cells and manipulate the organelles within the cell such as the Ribosomes, Golgi Apparatus, and Endoplasmic Reticulum in order to multiply which commonly results in the death of the host cell via cellular decay. All the viruses that were contained within the lipid bilayer of the cell membrane are then released into the intercellular matrix to infect neighboring cells to continue the viral life cycle.

White blood cells surround and consume the virus using a mechanism known as phagocytosis (a type of endocytosis) within the extracellular matrix to reduce and fight the infection. The components within the white blood cell are responsible for destroying the virus and recycling its components for the body to use.

=== Bacterial ===
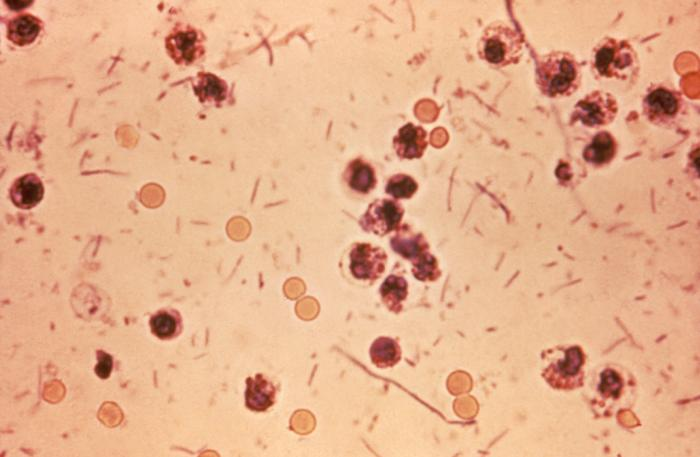
A photomicrograph of a stool that has shigella dysentery. This bacteria typically causes foodborne illness.

Although the vast majority of bacteria are harmless or beneficial to one's body, a few pathogenic bacteria can cause infectious diseases. The most common bacterial disease is tuberculosis, caused by the bacterium Mycobacterium tuberculosis, which affects about 2 million people mostly in sub-Saharan Africa. Pathogenic bacteria contribute to other globally important diseases, such as pneumonia, which can be caused by bacteria such as Streptococcus and Pseudomonas, and foodborne illnesses, which can be caused by bacteria such as Shigella, Campylobacter, and Salmonella. Pathogenic bacteria also cause infections such as tetanus, typhoid fever, diphtheria, syphilis, and Hansen's disease. They typically range between 1 and 5 micrometers in length.

=== Fungal ===
Fungi are a eukaryotic kingdom of microbes that are usually saprophytes, but can cause diseases in humans. Life-threatening fungal infections in humans most often occur in immunocompromised patients or vulnerable people with a weakened immune system, although fungi are common problems in the immunocompetent population as the causative agents of skin, nail, or yeast infections. Most antibiotics that function on bacterial pathogens cannot be used to treat fungal infections because fungi and their hosts both have eukaryotic cells. Most clinical fungicides belong to the azole group. The typical fungal spore size is 1-40 micrometers in length.

=== Other parasites ===
Protozoans are single-celled eukaryotes that feed on microorganisms and organic tissues. Considered as "one-celled animal" as they have animal like behaviors such as motility, predation, and a lack of a cell wall. Many protozoan pathogens are considered human parasites as they cause a variety of diseases such as: malaria, amoebiasis, babesiosis, giardiasis, toxoplasmosis, cryptosporidiosis, trichomoniasis, Chagas disease, leishmaniasis, African trypanosomiasis (sleeping sickness), Acanthamoeba keratitis, and primary amoebic meningoencephalitis (naegleriasis).

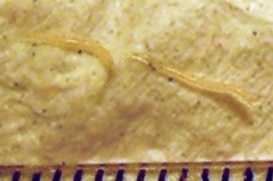
Two pinworms next to a ruler, measuring in 6 millimeters in length

Parasitic worms (Helminths) are macroparasites that can be seen by the naked eye. Worms live and feed in their living host, receiving nourishment and shelter while affecting the host's way of digesting nutrients. They also manipulate the host's immune system by secreting immunomodulatory products which allows them to live in their host for years. Many parasitic worms are more commonly intestinal that are soil-transmitted and infect the digestive tract; other parasitic worms are found in the host's blood vessels. Parasitic worms living in the host can cause weakness and even lead to many diseases. Parasitic worms can cause many diseases to both humans and animals. Helminthiasis (worm infection), Ascariasis, and enterobiasis (pinworm infection) are few that are caused by various parasitic worms.

=== Prionic ===
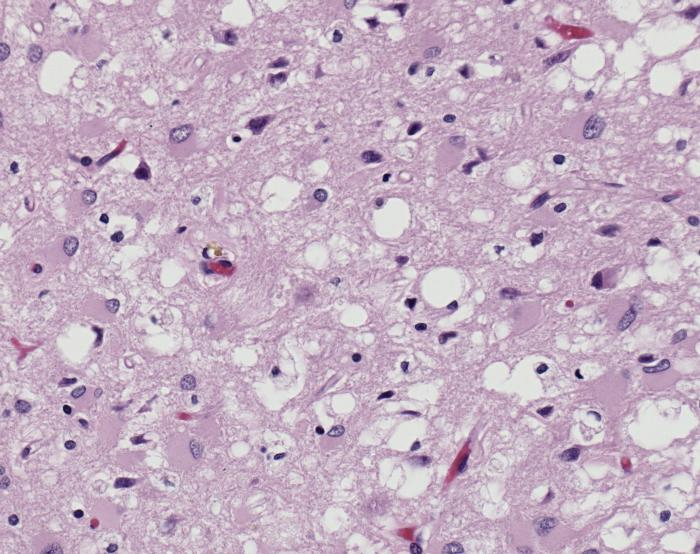
Magnified 100X and stained. This photomicrograph of the brain tissue shows the presence of the prominent spongiotic changes in the cortex, with the loss of neurons in a case of a variant of Creutzfeldt-Jakob disease (vCJD)

Prions are misfolded proteins that are transmissible and can influence abnormal folding of normal proteins in the brain. They do not contain any DNA or RNA and cannot replicate other than to convert already existing normal proteins to the misfolded state. These abnormally folded proteins are found characteristically in many neurodegenerative diseases as they aggregate the central nervous system and create plaques that damages the tissue structure. This essentially creates "holes" in the tissue. It has been found that prions transmit three ways: obtained, familial, and sporadic. It has also been found that plants play the role of vector for prions. There are eight different diseases that affect mammals that are caused by prions such as scrapie, bovine spongiform encephalopathy (mad cow disease) and Feline spongiform encephalopathy (FSE). There are also ten diseases that affect humans such as, Creutzfeldt–Jakob disease (CJD). and Fatal familial insomnia (FFI).

=== Animal pathogens ===
Animal pathogens are disease-causing agents of wild and domestic animal species, at times including humans.

== Virulence ==
Virulence (the tendency of a pathogen to cause damage to a host's fitness) evolves when that pathogen can spread from a diseased host, despite that host being very debilitated. An example is the malaria parasite, which can spread from a person near death, by hitching a ride to a healthy person on a mosquito that has bitten the diseased person. This is called horizontal transmission in contrast to vertical transmission, which tends to evolve symbiosis (after a period of high morbidity and mortality in the population) by linking the pathogen's evolutionary success to the evolutionary success of the host organism.

Evolutionary medicine has found that under horizontal transmission, the host population might never develop tolerance to the pathogen.

== Transmission ==
=== Chain of Infection ===
The chain of infection is a method of describing how a pathogen can spread and infect hosts in 6 stages. It starts with the pathogen, then describes the reservoir where that specific pathogen can multiply. The next step is the portal of exit, alluding to the method the pathogen leaves its reservoir. The mode of transport is how the pathogen is transmitted, which can occur through many different routes, including airborne, direct or indirect contact, sexual contact, through blood, breast milk, or other body fluids, and through the fecal-oral route. One example of direct contact is with contaminated bodily secretions, such as mucus. An indirect contact could be with a contaminated inanimate surface. Food and water can also become contaminated from the release of untreated sewage into a drinking water supply or onto cropland, with the result that people who eat or drink contaminated sources become infected. In developing countries, most sewage is discharged into the environment or on cropland; even in developed countries, some locations have periodic system failures that result in sanitary sewer overflows. The last two phases of the chain are the portal of entry that the pathogen takes and the susceptible host, also known as a susceptible individual, which is a person at risk of developing disease. An example of a reservoir in humans is the skin or gastrointestinal tract, as bacteria can normally be found there. Animals can also be reservoirs for many human pathogens. A portal of entry or exit for a pathogen could be through the mouth or nose. Coughing or sneezing, for instance, would allow a microorganism to exit the human body. Prions differ from other human pathogens, as they lack nucleic acids, like DNA or RNA, and are not transmitted through the same mechanisms. Often, they cause sporadic diseases, as they can arise due to an incorrectly folded protein.

Four Common Human Pathogens and their Chains of Infection
| Human Pathogen | Type of Pathogen | Reservoir | Portal of Exit | Mode of Transport | Portal of Entry | Susceptible Host |
|---|---|---|---|---|---|---|
| SARS-CoV-2 | Virus | Bats | Nose, mouth, eyes | Airborne (coughing, sneezing), contaminated fomites | Nose, mouth, eyes | Humans |
| Plasmodium falciparum (Malaria) | Parasite | Humans | Bloodstream | Mosquito bite, contaminated needle or syringe, blood transfusion | Bloodstream | Humans |
| Mycobacterium tuberculosis (Tuberculosis) | Bacteria | Humans | Nose, mouth | Airborne (coughing, sneezing) | Nose, mouth | Humans |
| Trichophyton rubrum (Ringworm) | Fungi | Humans, animals | Skin, scalp, nails | Direct skin contact, contaminated animals, contaminated fomites | Skin, scalp, nails | Humans, animals |

=== Immune System Response ===
After a pathogen is introduced into a human body, it is recognized by a human's immune system as foreign, triggering a response in the form of an innate and adaptive mechanisms. The innate response is a general non-specific defense that recognizes common structural features present in many different microorganisms. However, it can still vary between pathogens. For instance, causing inflammation is a common innate response to decrease replication of a virus, but SARS-CoV-2 has evolved a mechanism to prevent this response. In contrast, the adaptive response is more specific, involving T Cells and B Cells.

Often times, human pathogens rely on their host for nutrients to survive and multiply. Actions of the immune system can prevent the pathogen from receiving required nutrients, however, which allows humans to fight off infection.

== Examples ==
- Bacillus anthracis — the causative agent of anthrax in humans and animals
- Clostridium botulinum — releases the most powerful neurotoxin leading to death from botulism
- Mycobacterium tuberculosis — the causative agent of most cases of tuberculosis
- Mycobacterium leprae — the bacterium that causes leprosy (Hansen's disease)
- Yersinia pestis — pneumonic, septicemic, and the notorious bubonic plagues (Black Death)
- Rickettsia prowazekii — the etiologic agent of typhus fever
- Bartonella spp.
- Spanish influenza virus
- Entamoeba histolytica virus amoeba or amoebiasis

== See also ==
- Cancer bacteria
- Emerging Pathogens Institute
- Oncovirus
- List of clinically important bacteria
- Lists of diseases
- List of human diseases associated with infectious pathogens
- List of infectious diseases
- List of parasites of humans
