= John Stanley Griffith =

British scientist

John Stanley Griffith (1928–1972) was a British chemist, mathematician and biophysicist. He was the nephew of the distinguished British bacteriologist Frederick Griffith.

== Career ==
Beginning as an undergraduate in mathematics at Trinity College, Cambridge in 1946–1949, he went on to read Part II biochemistry in 1949–1951. His research career continued in theoretical chemistry at Oxford and Cambridge, where he held a Berry-Ramsey research fellowship at King's College. He had several appointments in Britain and the US in his different disciplines. These included professorships in chemistry at Indiana University Bloomington and at the University of Pennsylvania, where he received the Marlow Award of the Royal Society of Chemistry in 1961. He then spent time at the Department of Mathematics at UMIST in Manchester. In 1967 he was appointed to a chair in the Department of Mathematics of Bedford College, London, where his inaugural lecture was entitled "The Neural Basis of Conscious Decision". In 1968 he moved back to the Department of Chemistry at Bloomington.

== Research ==
His early work was in the inorganic chemistry of transition metal ions and ligand field theory.

During the 1960s, Griffith and radiation biologist Tikvah Alper developed the hypothesis that some transmissible spongiform encephalopathies (TSEs) are caused by an infectious agent consisting solely of proteins. This idea was eventually developed by Prusiner and others into the so-called prion hypothesis. In 1951, when he was just 23, at Francis Crick's suggestion, Griffith performed quantum mechanical calculations on what later became known as complementary base pairing.

Griffith has published several books, including "The Theory of Transition-Metal Ions" (1961), "The Irreducible Tensor Method for Molecular Symmetry Groups" (1962), and "Mathematical Neurobiology: An Introduction to the Mathematics of the Nervous System" (1971).

== See also ==
- Tikvah Alper
- Stanley B. Prusiner
- prion
- transmissible spongiform encephalopathies
