= Familial Alzheimer-like prion disease =

Inherited neurodegenerative disease

- Other names: Familial prion disease with Alzheimer disease-like tau pathology and clinical phenotype
- Specialty: Neurology
- Usual onset: Adulthood
- Causes: Mutation of PRNP
- Treatment: Symptomatic treatment
- Frequency: 0.0001%

Familial Alzheimer-like prion disease is an exceptionally rare inherited prion disease. Its name comes from its presentation, which is similar to Alzheimer's disease.

== Symptoms ==
This disease is unusual in that, unlike other prion diseases, it does not present with myoclonus or ataxia. Instead, the initial presentation involves anxiety, depression, and memory impairment before progression into dementia. This dementia has a slow course, also atypical for a prion disease, and will eventually lead to the death of the patient years after onset.
