= PrP systemic amyloidosis =

Inherited neurodegenerative disease

- Other names: Prion protein systemic amyloidosis, chronic diarrhea with hereditary sensory and autonomic neuropathy, prion disease associated with diarrhea and autonomic neuropathy
- Multiple brain regions showing extensive neuronal loss and abnormal prion protein micro-plaques.
- Specialty: Neurology
- Usual onset: 30–40 years old
- Causes: Mutation of PRNP
- Treatment: Palliative care
- Medication: None
- Prognosis: Invariably fatal, life expectancy up to 30 years after symptom development
- Frequency: 16 cases worldwide

PrP systemic amyloidosis is an extremely rare, incurable, and invariably fatal inherited neurodegenerative disease belonging to the transmissible spongiform encephalopathy (TSE) group, also known as prion diseases. However, unlike most prion diseases, PrP systemic amyloidosis is not isolated to the central nervous system; the prion amyloid has extensive peripheral involvement, finding its way to peripheral nerves and internal organs. Because of this, it is classified as a type of amyloidosis. The initial presentation of this disease involves chronic diarrhea and autonomic neuropathy, before progressing into neurodegeneration, ultimately leading to death.

== Symptoms ==
The initial presentation of PrP systemic amyloidosis is chronic diarrhea and urinary tract infections in the fourth decade of life, which may be misdiagnosed as Crohn's disease or irritable bowel syndrome. Sensory neuropathy and/or autonomic neuropathy follows after. In one case, the disease caused optic nerve atrophy and visual disturbances in a Japanese woman.

Symptoms later in the disease include areflexia, orthostatic hypotension, and nausea. Peripheral neuropathy also occurs, leading to persistent hypoesthesia and chronic pain. Eventually, the disease will impact the central nervous system, leading to the onset of neurodegeneration, which causes rapid cognitive decline, seizures, and dysautonomia, which progress into akinetic mutism. Death usually follows shortly after.

== Causes ==
PrP systemic amyloidosis is caused by a genetic truncation of the PRNP gene, specifically in nonsense codons such as Y157X, Y162X, and Y163X. It takes the form of an autosomal dominant disorder, typically affecting those between the ages of 30 to 40. There is concern of potential iatrogenic transmission, as bowel symptoms may be investigated or treated through surgical means. However, mouse studies did not show any transmissibility. Only 16 people have ever been confirmed to have the disease across five families; three British, one Italian, and one Japanese respectively.

== Treatment ==
Like all transmissible spongiform encephalopathies, there is no cure, nor there is a way to slow the progression of the disease. As a result, support remains only palliative. Therapies and medication are aimed at treating or slowing down the effects of the symptoms, like monitoring organ damage or managing symptoms of chronic diarrhea in attempts to improve the patient's quality of life.
