= Variably protease-sensitive prionopathy =

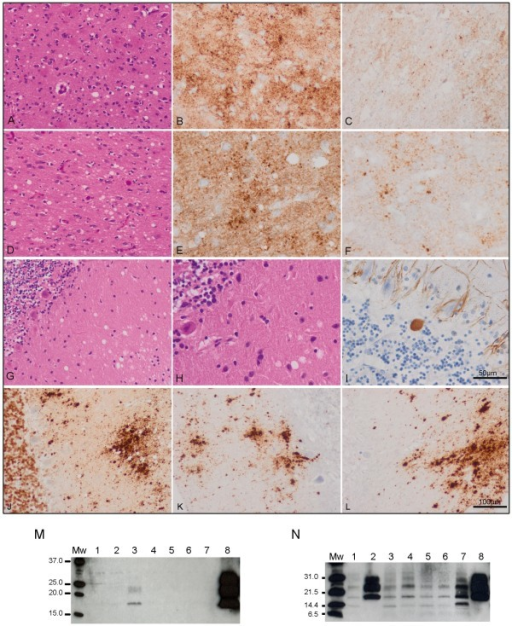
- Protease sensitive and resistant prionopathies coexisting in this immunohistological test
- Symptoms: Dementia, behavioral and psychiatric symptoms, ataxia, parkinsonism
- Usual onset: 70 years
- Causes: Prion
- Differential diagnosis: Alzheimer's disease
- Treatment: Supportive
- Prognosis: Average survival 24 months
- Frequency: 2-3 per 100 million people

Variably protease-sensitive prionopathy (VPSPr) (formerly known as protease sensitive prionopathy) is a sporadic transmissible spongiform encephalopathy first described in an abstract for a conference on prions in 2006. The study was published in a 2008 report on 11 cases. It was first identified as a distinct disease in 2010 by Zou W.Q. and coworkers from the United States National Prion Disease Pathology Surveillance Center. VPSPr shares similarities to other neurodegenerative disorders such as Creutzfeldt-Jakob disease and Alzheimer's, but there are unique markers of the disease in its clinical manifestations and electrophoretic profile.

== Symptoms ==
VPSPr is very rare, occurring in just 2 or 3 out of every 100 million people. As of 2018, fourteen cases have been reported in the UK. It has similarities to Creutzfeldt–Jakob disease, but clinical manifestations differ somewhat, and the abnormal prion protein (PrP) is less resistant to digestion by proteases; some variants are more sensitive to proteases than others, hence the name: variably protease-sensitive. VPSPr affects those who possess each of three genotypes at codon 129 of the PrP gene, meaning VPSPr can manifest as three different subtypes: MM, MV, and VV.

A single‐photon emission computed tomography scan that shows a predominant left dorsolateral prefrontal cortex and insula hypoperfusion.

Patients present with behavioral and psychiatric symptoms, speech deficits (aphasia and/or dysarthria) and progressive cognitive and motor decline (dementia, ataxia, parkinsonism, psychosis, aphasia and mood disorder). The average age at onset is 70 years, and the duration of survival is 24 months. About 40% of patients have a family history of dementia. Like CJD, it can be mistaken for Alzheimer's dementia. Though there are clear similarities, there are also unique symptoms of VPSPr that differ from CJD and other neurodegenerative disorders and prion diseases, including the presence of prominent aphasia and ataxia, a longer duration of disease, and a ladder-like electrophoretic profile of protease K (PK). The formation of the ladder-like structure that can be seen after electrophoresis is a process reliant on the presence of PK, enhanced by a basic pH.

== Diagnosis ==
Diagnosis is difficult, as pathognomonic signs on MRI such as cortical ribboning or hockey stick sign, periodic sharp wave complexes on EEG, and tests for 14-3-3 protein and tau protein are usually not helpful, and no mutations have been observed in the coding region of the PrP gene, unlike CJD and Variant CJD. The diagnosis can be made on pathological examination. There are unique microscopic and immunohistochemical features, and the prions cannot be digested using proteases. Because 8 out of 10 patients had a positive family history of dementia in the original study, a genetic cause was suspected. Some have suggested the disease may be a sporadic form of Gerstmann–Sträussler–Scheinker syndrome (GSS). The inability to reliably diagnose VPSPr in living patients can delay symptom management, which is the only current form of treatment available. A proposed diagnostic criteria for VPSPr includes cognitive impairment and/or at least two other clinical manifestations, symptom duration of under eight years, and phenotypical divergence from other neurodegenerative disorders.

One diagnostic method being explored to differentiate VPSPr from similar diseases such as Alzheimer's and CJD is capillary based electrophoresis (CE). A unique feature in VPSPr is its 7kDa fragment, which is too small to be detected by traditional Western blotting but is more likely to be detected by CE, especially in the VV genotype.

== Research ==
A 2013 study finds that the peculiar protease-resistant PrP (PrP^{res}) originally found in VPSPr is also detectable in the brain of patients with a genetic CJD linked to PrP Valine (V) to isoleucine (I) mutation at residue 180 (PrPV180I).
