= Sonia M. Vallabh =

American prion researcher

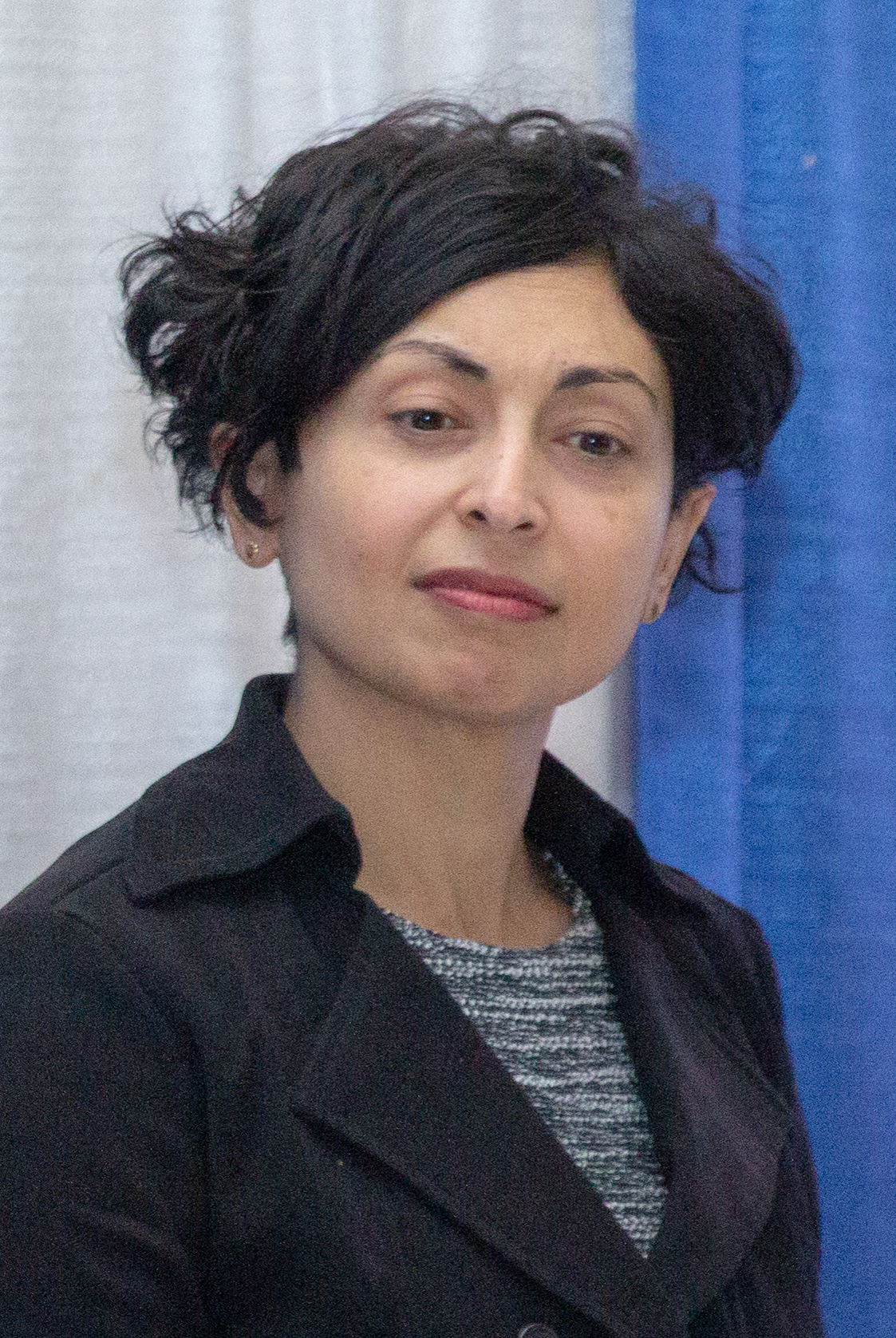
- Vallabh in 2025
- Born: March 19, 1984
- Occupation: Researcher
- Spouse: Eric Vallabh Minikel
- Children: 2

Academic background
- Education: Harvard University
- Thesis: Antisense Oligonucleotides for the Prevention of Genetic Prion Disease (2019)
- Doctoral advisor: Stuart L. Schreiber

Academic work
- Discipline: Biological and Biomedical Sciences

Sonia Minikel Vallabh is an American scientist focused on prion diseases, particularly fatal familial insomnia. She is noted for being a "patient-scientist" who proactively studies a genetic disorder she is a patient of, aiming to cure it before it kills her.

== Biography ==
Before beginning her career as a scientist, Vallabh studied and practiced law, having graduated from Harvard Law School and Swarthmore College. In 2010, her mother, Kamni, suddenly developed profound and aggressive dementia that killed her six months after symptoms first developed. An autopsy revealed that her mother had died from fatal familial insomnia, an incurable genetic disorder that causes misfolded proteins to destroy the brain. A blood sample from Vallabh herself revealed she had inherited the causal mutation.

The revelation inspired Vallabh and her husband, Eric Vallabh Minikel, to retrain as biomedical scientists with the goal of saving her life. She received a Doctorate of Philosophy from Harvard in 2019 and became a senior leader at the Broad Institute prion lab.

In October 2012, Vallabh and her husband founded the Prion Alliance, a non-profit 501(c)(3) organization dedicated towards scientific research into prion disease treatment and cure.

In 2023, she earned the Paper of the Year Award from the Oligonucleotide Therapeutics Society.

As of 2026, prion diseases remain invariably fatal. However, research published by Vallabh and her husband may represent the first steps towards treatment. In 2024, the group described CHARM, an engineered protein that selectively silences the expression of PrnP, the gene responsible for inherited prion diseases. In 2025, they found that CHARM prolonged the lives of rats with prion disease by 52%.

Vallabh has two children, both born via IVF and genetic screening in order to avoid the possibility of them inheriting her disorder. She noted that she felt "lucky" to live in Massachusetts which provided relative affordability for IVF treatment.
