= Central nervous system viral disease =

- Specialty: Neurology/infectious disease

The central nervous system (CNS) controls most of the functions of the body and mind. It comprises the brain, spinal cord and the nerve fibers that branch off to all parts of the body. The CNS viral diseases are caused by viruses that attack the CNS. Existing and emerging viral CNS infections are major sources of human morbidity and mortality.

Virus infections usually begin in the peripheral tissues, and can invade the mammalian system by spreading into the peripheral nervous system and more rarely the CNS. CNS is protected by effective immune responses and multi-layer barriers, but some viruses enter with high-efficiency through the bloodstream and some by directly infecting the nerves that innervate the tissues.

Most viruses that enter can be opportunistic and accidental pathogens, but some like herpes viruses and rabies virus have evolved in time to enter the nervous system efficiently, by exploiting the neuronal cell biology. While acute viral diseases come on quickly, chronic viral conditions have long incubation periods inside the body. Their symptoms develop slowly and follow a progressive, fatal course.

== Types ==
- Most forms of aseptic meningitis are viral in origin, though neoplastic and Lyme disease meningitis are also aseptic.
- California encephalitis virus
- Central nervous system viral disease
- Cytomegalovirus encephalitis
- SARS-CoV-2
- Eastern equine encephalitis
- Enterovirus encephalitis
- Epstein–Barr virus encephalitis
- Herpes simplex encephalitis
- Influenza encephalitis
- Japanese encephalitis
- La Crosse encephalitis
- Lymphocytic choriomeningitis by arenavirus
- Measles encephalitis
- Mumps
- Nipah virus encephalitis
- Poliomyelitis
- Progressive rubella panencephalitis, a late complication of congenital rubella syndrome
- St. Louis encephalitis
- Slow virus infections, which include:
  - Acquired immunodeficiency syndrome (AIDS)
  - Subacute sclerosing panencephalitis by Measles virus
  - Progressive multifocal leukoencephalopathy
- Rabies
- Tick-borne encephalitis
- Varicella
- Viral encephalitis lists 37 causes
- Viral meningitis
- Western equine encephalitis

== Symptoms ==
Characteristics of a viral infection can include pain, swelling, redness, impaired function, fever, drowsiness, confusion and convulsions.

== Diagnosis ==
=== Classification ===
- Acute - the most common diseases caused by acute viral infections are encephalitis, flaccid paralysis, aseptic meningitis, post infectious and encephalomyelitis.
- Chronic - the most common diseases caused by chronic viral infections are subacute-sclerosing panencephalitis, progressive multifocal leukoencephalopathy, retrovirus disease and spongiform encephalopathies.

== Prevention ==
Prophylactic vaccination is available against poliomyelitis, measles, Japanese encephalitis, and rabies. Hyper immune immunoglobulin has been used for prophylaxis of measles, herpes zoster virus, HSV-2, vaccine, rabies, and some other infections in high-risk groups.

== Treatment ==
Treatments of proven efficacy are currently limited mostly to herpes viruses and human immunodeficiency virus. The herpes virus is of two types: herpes type 1 (HSV-1, or oral herpes) and herpes type 2 (HSV-2, or genital herpes). Although there is no particular cure; there are treatments that can relieve the symptoms. Drugs like Famvir, Zovirax, and Valtrex are among the drugs used, but these medications can only decrease pain and shorten the healing time. They can also decrease the total number of outbreaks in the surrounding. Warm baths also may relieve the pain of genital herpes.

Human Immunodeficiency Virus Infection (HIV) is treated by using a combination of medications to fight against the HIV infection in the body. This is called antiretroviral therapy (ART). ART is not a cure, but it can control the virus so that a person can live a longer, healthier life and reduce the risk of transmitting HIV to others around him. ART involves taking a combination of HIV medicines (called an HIV regimen) every day, exactly as prescribed by the doctor. These HIV medicines prevent HIV Virus from multiplying (making copies of itself in the body), which reduces the amount of HIV in the body. Having less HIV in the body gives the immune system a chance to recover and fight off infections and cancers. Even though there is still some HIV in the body, the immune system is strong enough to fight off infections and cancers. By reducing the amount of HIV in the body, HIV medicines also reduce the risk of transmitting the virus to others. ART is recommended for all people with HIV, regardless of how long they've had the virus or how healthy they are. If left untreated, HIV will attack the immune system and eventually progress to AIDS.

=== New therapies ===
Development of new therapies has been hindered by the lack of appropriate animal model systems for some important viruses and also because of the difficulty in conducting human clinical trials for diseases that are rare. Nonetheless, numerous innovative approaches to antiviral therapy are available including candidate thiazolide and purazinecarboxamide derivatives with potential broad-spectrum antiviral efficacy. New herpes virus drugs include viral helicase-primase and terminase inhibitors. A promising new area of research involves therapies based on enhanced understanding of host antiviral immune responses.

== Epidemiology ==
Many viral infections of the central nervous system occur in seasonal peaks or as epidemics, whereas others, such as herpes simplex encephalitis, are sporadic. In endemic areas it is mostly a disease of children, but as the disease spreads to new regions, or nonimmune travelers visit endemic regions, nonimmune adults are also affected.

== Children ==
Meningitis is very common in children. Newborns can develop herpes virus infections through contact with infected secretions in the birth canal. Other viral infections are acquired by breathing air contaminated with virus-containing droplets exhaled by an infected person. Arbovirus infections are acquired from bites by infected insects (called epidemic encephalitis). Viral central nervous system infections in newborns and infants usually begin with fever. The inability of infants to communicate directly makes it difficult to understand their symptoms. Newborns may have no other symptoms and may initially not otherwise appear ill. Infants older than a month or so typically become irritable and fussy and refuse to eat. Vomiting is common. Sometimes the soft spot on top of a newborn's head (fontanelle) bulges, indicating an increase in pressure on the brain. Because irritation of the meninges is worsened by movement, an infant with meningitis may cry more, rather than calm down, when picked up and rocked. Some infants develop a strange, high-pitched cry. Infants with encephalitis often have seizures or other abnormal movements. Infants with severe encephalitis may become lethargic and comatose and then die. To make the diagnosis of meningitis or the diagnosis of encephalitis, doctors do a spinal tap (lumbar puncture) to obtain cerebrospinal fluid (CSF) for laboratory analysis in children.

== Risks for other diseases ==
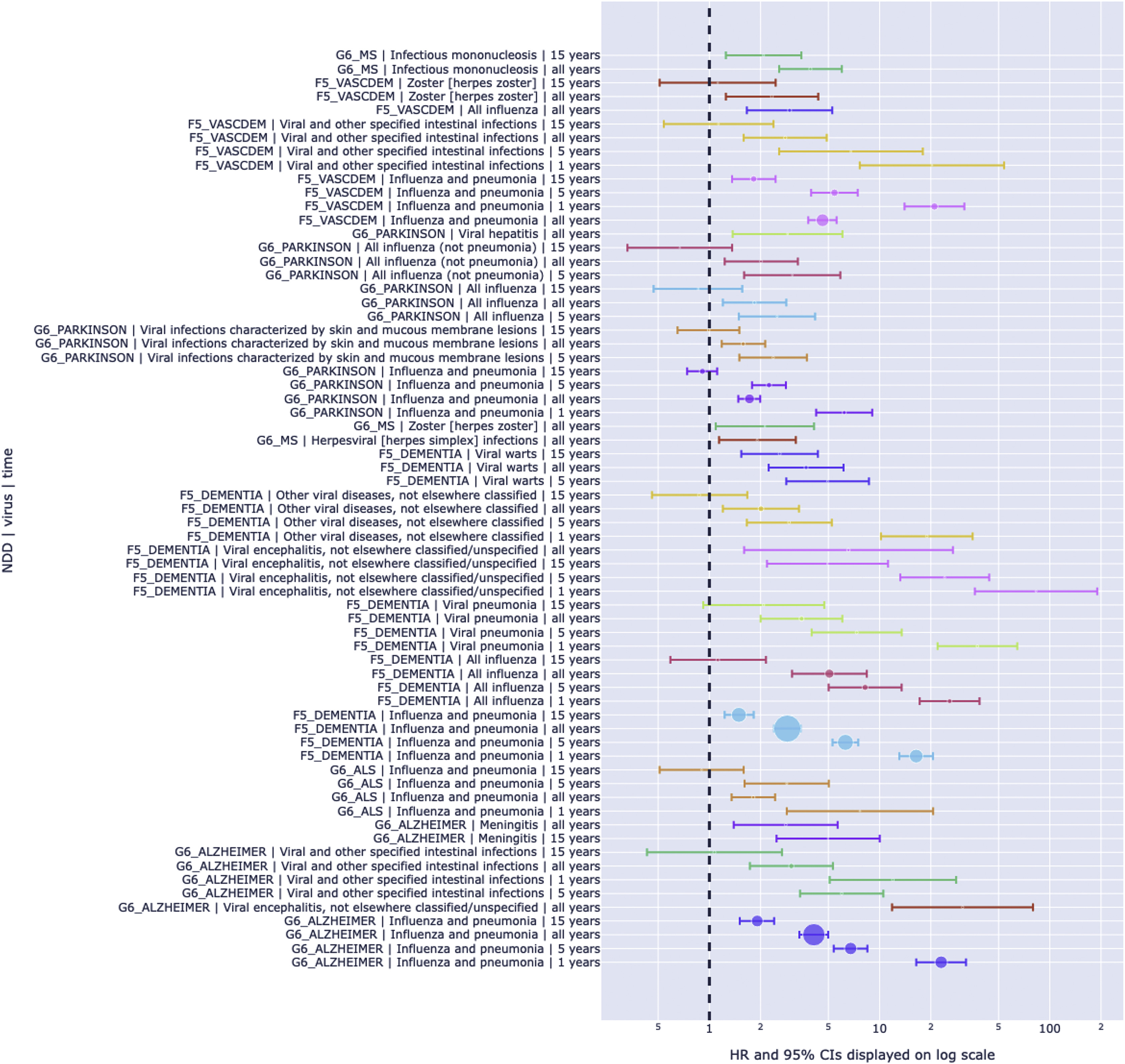
Risks from viral exposures according to one biobank study

A study using electronic health records indicates that 45 (with 22 of these being replicated with the UK Biobank and not all of them necessarily central nervous system viral diseases) viral exposures can significantly elevate risks of neurodegenerative disease, including up to 15 years after infection.

== See also ==
- List of central nervous system infections
- Aging brain § Immune system and fluids
