= Camel spongiform encephalopathy =

- Other names: CSE
- Specialty: Neurology

Camel spongiform encephalopathy (CSE), commonly known as mad camel disease, is similar to mad cow disease. It was discovered by the Algerian veterinarian Baaissa Babelhadj, lecturer-researcher Semir Bechir Suheil Gaouar (University of Tlemcen) and a colleague in Ouargla, in collaboration with Italian researchers. This infection is a form of prion disease (transmissible spongiform encephalopathy, TSE) that affects camels.

Some signs and symptoms which have been observed in adult dromedaries during antemortem examinations include weight loss, tremors, aggressiveness, hyperreactivity, hesitant and uncertain gait, ataxia of hind limbs, occasional falls, and difficulty getting up. The early stages of the condition are mainly characterized by behavioral signs, such as loss of appetite, irritability, and aggressiveness. As the disease progresses, neurological signs become more apparent and animals start exhibiting ataxia that leads to recumbency and death. The signs and symptoms of this condition progress slowly, and the disease lasts for 3–8 months.
