= PRND =

Protein-coding gene in the species Homo sapiens

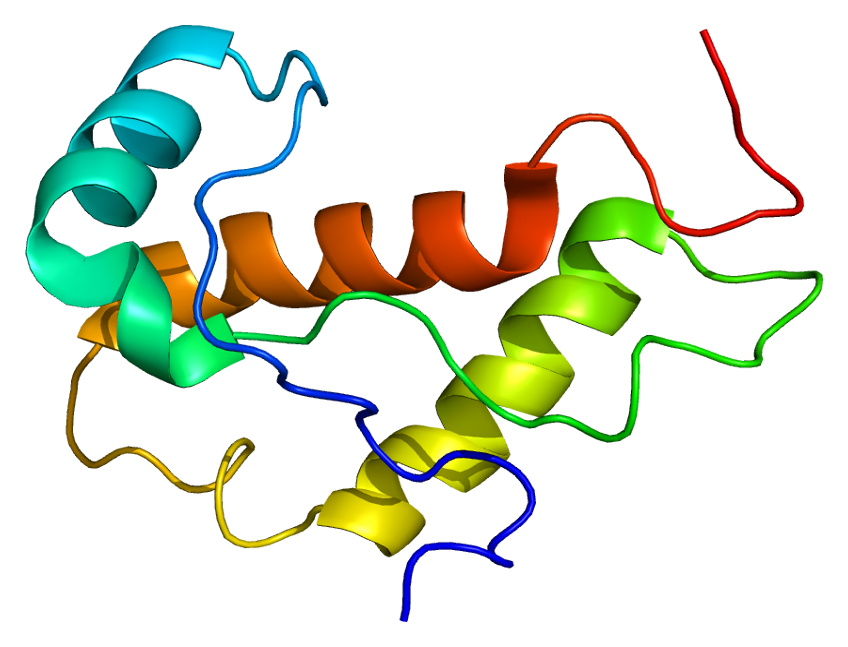

Identifiers
- Aliases: PRND, DOPPEL, DPL, PrPLP, dJ1068H6.4, prion protein 2 (dublet), prion like protein doppel
- External IDs: OMIM: 604263; MGI: 1346999; GeneCards: PRND
Available structures
PDB	Ortholog search: PDBe RCSB
PDB	List of PDB id codes 1LG4

Gene location (Human)
Chr.	Chromosome 20 (human)
Band	20p13	Start	4,721,909 bp
Band	20p13	End	4,728,460 bp

Gene location (Mouse)
Chr.	Chromosome 2 (mouse)
Band	2 F2|2 64.07 cM	Start	131,792,781 bp
Band	2 F2|2 64.07 cM	End	131,798,050 bp
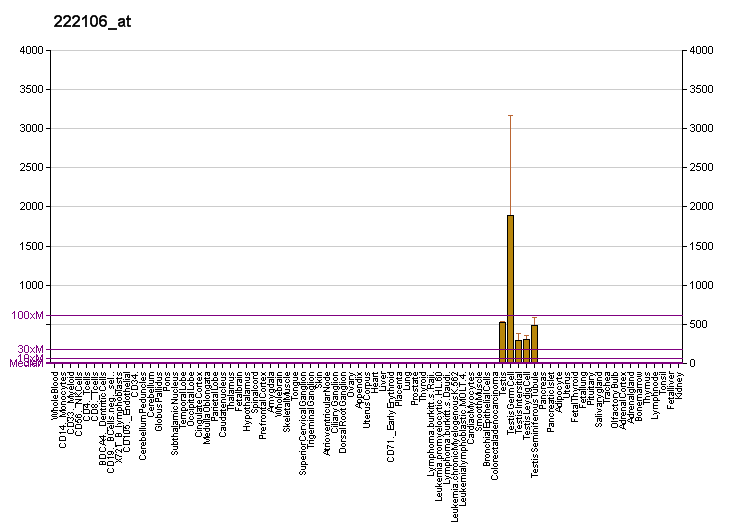
RNA expression pattern
Bgee	Human / Mouse (ortholog); Top expressed in: right testis; left testis; Epithelium of choroid plexus; visceral pleura; testicle; skin of hip; parietal pleura; body of uterus; gallbladder; myometrium / Top expressed in: testicle; spermatocyte; stomach; ventricle of the heart; neural tube; genital tubercle; midgut; spermatid; Hindgut; embryo; More reference expression data
BioGPS	More reference expression data
Gene ontology
Molecular function	copper ion binding; metal ion binding
Cellular component	anchored component of membrane; membrane; extracellular region; plasma membrane; anchored component of external side of plasma membrane
Biological process	protein homooligomerization; cellular copper ion homeostasis; acrosome reaction; single fertilization
Sources:Amigo / QuickGO
Orthologs
Databases	NCBI: entry; OMA: entry
Species	Human	Mouse
Entrez	23627	26434
Ensembl	ENSG00000171864	ENSMUSG00000027338
UniProt	Q9UKY0	Q9QUG3
RefSeq (mRNA)	NM_012409	NM_001126338; NM_001278257; NM_001278520; NM_023043
RefSeq (protein)	NP_036541	NP_001119810; NP_001265186; NP_001265449; NP_075530
Location (UCSC)	Chr 20: 4.72 – 4.73 Mb	Chr 2: 131.79 – 131.8 Mb
PubMed search
- Wikidata
View/Edit Human	View/Edit Mouse

Prion protein 2 (dublet), also known as PRND, or Doppel protein, is a protein which in humans is encoded by the PRND gene.

This gene is found on chromosome 20, approximately 20 kbp downstream of the gene encoding cellular prion protein, to which it is biochemically and structurally similar. The protein encoded by this gene is a membrane glycosylphosphatidylinositol-anchored glycoprotein that is found predominantly in testis. Mutations in this gene may lead to neurological disorders.
