= Tikvah Alper =

Radiobiologist

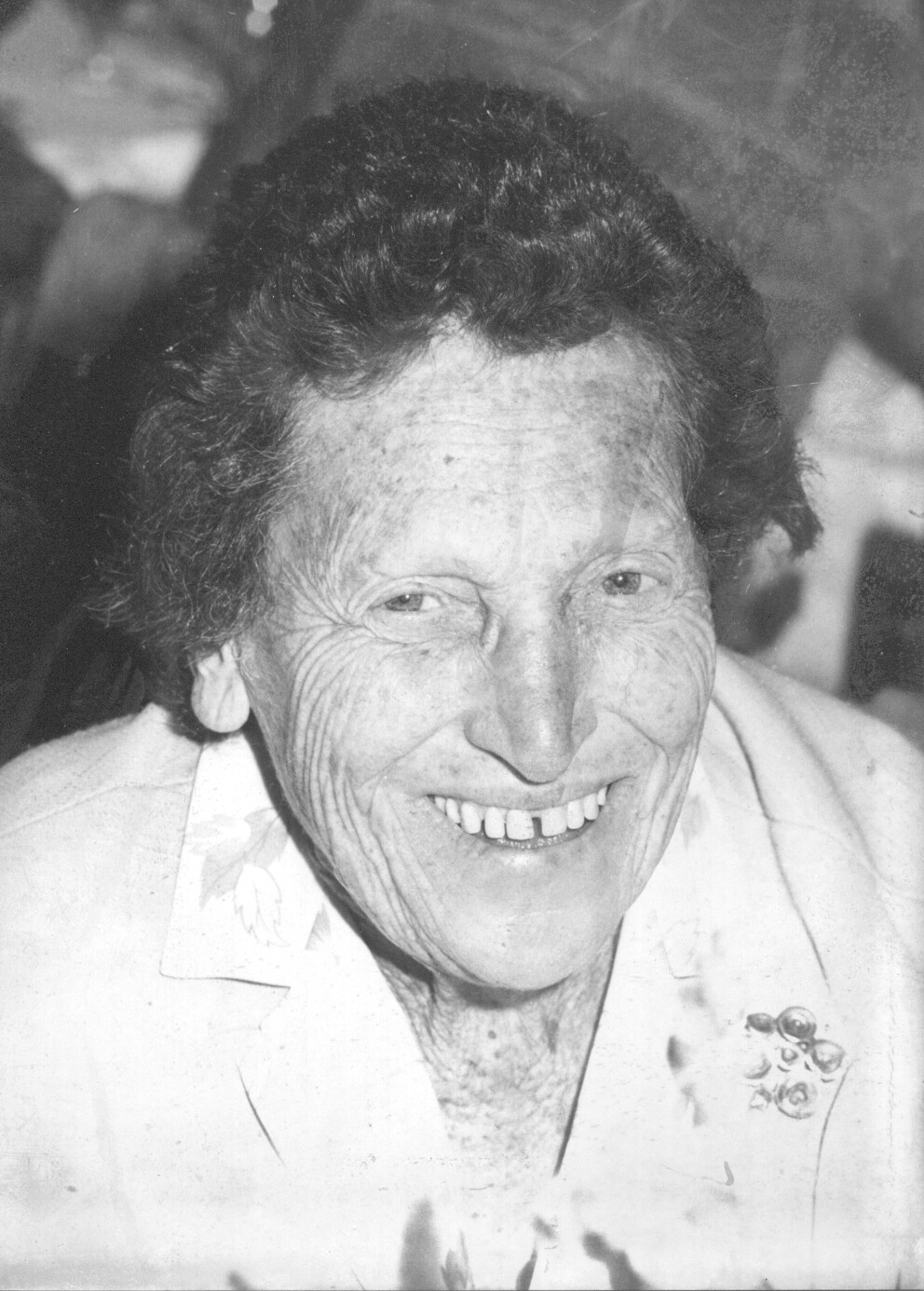
- Alper in the 1970s
- Born: 22 January 1909; Wynberg, Cape Town
- Died: 2 February 1995 (aged 86); Sarisbury, Hampshire, England
- Education: University of Cape Town; Kaiser Wilhelm Institute for Chemistry
- Known for: research on the infectious agent in scrapie, made notable during the Mad cow disease outbreak in Britain in the 1990s
- Spouse: Max Sterne (1906–1994)
- Children: 2
- Scientific career
- Institutions: University of the Witwatersrand; Hammersmith Hospital
- Doctoral advisor: Lise Meitner

Tikvah Alper (22 January 1909 – 2 February 1995) was a distinguished radiobiologist, who had trained as a physicist. Among many other initiatives and discoveries, she was among the first to find evidence indicating that the infectious agent in scrapie does not contain nucleic acid: a finding that was instrumental in understanding the development of the prion theory. She was director of the MRC Experimental Radiopathology Unit, Hammersmith Hospital, London, UK, 1962–1974.

== Early life and career ==
Tikvah Alper was born in South Africa, the youngest of four daughters in a family of Jewish refugees from Russia. As a schoolgirl at Durban Girls' High School, she was described as "the most intellectually distinguished girl ever to attend the school", and matriculated with distinction a year early. She graduated with distinction in physics from University of Cape Town in 1929, and then studied in Berlin with the nuclear physicist Lise Meitner in 1930–32, publishing a prize-winning paper on delta rays produced by alpha particles in 1933.

In 1932, she returned to South Africa to marry the (later) renowned bacteriologist Max Sterne, the inventor of the most effective livestock vaccine for anthrax. She kept her maiden name throughout her marriage. Because married women were not then permitted to work at university, Tikvah and Max established a home laboratory where they worked together. Their sons, Jonathan and Michael, were born in 1935 and 1936. From then on, Tikvah Alper combined demands of motherhood (Jonathan was born profoundly deaf), marriage and career. These included pre- and post-war spells in England, where she worked with the pioneer radiobiologist, Douglas Lea.

Over ten years from 1937, Tikvah retrained and then also worked as a teacher of the deaf. Her physics training and technical skills were evident in her published research on making speech articulation visible, for use in speech training for deaf children She became head of the Biophysics section of the South African National Physics Laboratory in 1948.

== Later career ==
Despite their growing scientific renown, in 1951, Max Sterne and Tikvah Alper were forced to leave South Africa because of their outspoken opposition to apartheid. Tikvah found an (unpaid) research post at the MRC Radiobiology Laboratories at the Hammersmith Hospital, London, directed by Hal Gray, whom she had met on earlier visits. Here, work focussed on the mechanisms of the effects of radiation on cell biology. The complexities of the effects of radiation on different cell types, and their interaction with other physiological and chemical processes began to be mapped out at this time, and continued through the 1950s and 60s. She was director of the Radiobiology Unit from 1962 until her retirement in 1974. Her classic text Cellular Radiobiology was published in 1979. Tikvah Alper continued an active professional life in retirement, culminating in a "brilliant lecture to the Radiation Research Society in Dallas, USA at the age of 83..". She died in Sarisbury, Hampshire, England, in 1995, and was survived by her husband Max, sons Jonathan and Michael, six grandchildren, and three great-grandchildren.

== Role in scrapie research ==
Scrapie is a fatal infectious disease of the neural system of sheep; one of a class of prion diseases that can affect cattle (BSE) and humans (Kuru, nCJD). Scrapie had been thought to be caused by a 'slow virus' – one that could take years to show as a change in behaviour or movement. By the mid-1960s, it was established that cells could only replicate via DNA. Radioactivity stops cell replication by 'killing' DNA. Alper found that radiation did not kill the infective agent in scrapie, suggesting that a virus was unlikely to be the infective agent. The infective agent had to be smaller and simpler than (viral) DNA. Alper also found that the agent remained active under ultraviolet light. DNA is inactive under UV light. Instead, the agent was killed by light at 237 nm, a wavelength specific to polysaccharide inactivation. Alper and colleagues reported these properties of the scrapie agent – a finding that was greeted with astonishment in many quarters, for it appeared to contravene the central dogma that holds that replication (and hence the growth of the disease and its infectious properties) can only proceed via DNA. However, once these empirical findings were accepted, several theories developed to accommodate the peculiar properties of the scrapie agent. The most widely accepted theory today is the prion theory, which posits a 'rogue' protein as the infectious source. However, Alper could not accept that a protein 'mutation' was the agent. Firstly, her UV radiation studies did not indicate a protein agent and, secondly, isolated prions did not induce scrapie. Her own theories concerning the agent were developed in the last years of her life and suggested a more dynamic and complex story.

== See also ==
- Timeline of women in science
