= Feline spongiform encephalopathy =

Feline brain disease

Feline spongiform encephalopathy (FSE) is a neurodegenerative disease that affects the brains of felines. This disease is known to affect domestic, captive, and wild species of the family Felidae. Like bovine spongiform encephalopathy (BSE), this disease can take several years to develop.

== Causes ==
Like other forms of transmissible spongiform encephalopathy (TSE), FSE is caused by contact from a misfolded form of the prion protein (PrP^{Sc}) which causes normal prion protein molecules (PrP^{C}) to become misfolded. Better-known examples of TSE include BSE in bovines, Creutzfeldt–Jakob disease (CJD) in humans, scrapie in sheep and chronic wasting disease in deer.

FSE was first identified in the UK shortly after the BSE outbreak. These cases are believed to be a result of felines ingesting bovine meat contaminated with BSE. Prions from human TSE as well as deer chronic wasting disease can also cause FSE under laboratory conditions. However, scrapie prions from sheep cannot cause FSE in cats, indicating a difference between TSE prions from different species.

Contact with FSE prions from sick cats (horizontal transmission) is assumed to spread the disease, but no laboratory research has been done into this topic as of 2006. One suspected case of maternal (vertical) transmission was reported in captive cheetahs in 2009. FSE prions can infect TgOvPrP4 mice which produce large amounts of the sheep version of the prion protein.

== Symptoms and signs ==
Clinical signs of FSE typically develop gradually in housecats, ranging from several weeks to months. Initial signs of the condition include behavioral changes such as aggression, timidity, hiding, hyperesthesia, loss of motor functions, and polydipsia. Other commonly observed motor signs include gait abnormalities and ataxia, which typically affect the hind legs first. Affected cats may also display poor judgement of distance, and some cats may develop a rapid, crouching, hypermetric gait. Some affected cats may exhibit an abnormal head tilt, tremors, a vacant stare, excessive salivation, decreased grooming behaviors, polyphagia, and dilated pupils. Ataxia was observed to last for about 8 weeks in the affected animals.

== Diagnosis ==
This disease can only be confirmed via a post-mortem examination, which includes identification of bilaterally symmetrical vacuolation of the neuropil and vacuolation in neurones. Lesions are likely to be found in basal ganglia, cerebral cortex and thalamus of the brain.

FSE prions show some accumulation in the kidney and adrenal glands of an infected cheetah, which is unusual for prion diseases. This accumulation could allow FSE prions to be excreted in urine. The detection was questioned in 2009 but reaffirmed in 2010. Similar detection has also been reported in domestic cats.

== Treatment ==
This is a terminal condition and there is currently no specific treatment for the disease. In most instances, infected felines die spontaneously within a few months to years, or are euthanized due to this condition.

Any material from the infected cat should be carefully handled to eliminate the prion protein so as to not infect humans or other animals. General guidelines for prion inactivation apply (see Prion § Sterilization). It may be very difficult to decontaminate a facility that has housed infected animals.

== Epidemiology ==
This disease was first reported in domestic cats within the United Kingdom in 1990, only four years after the first reports of BSE. Since 1990, cases have been reported in other countries and other feline species in captivity, although most affected felines originated in the UK.

The average age of felines that have been affected by this disease is 11 years of age, with the age range being roughly 2–10 years. All breeds are equally affected. Some genetic variation has been reported in the Prnp gene of domestic cats but no effect on the course of disease for these variations are known.
