= Exotic ungulate encephalopathy =

Prion disease

Exotic ungulate encephalopathy is a transmissible spongiform encephalopathy (TSE), or prion disease, identified in infected organs of zoo animals. This subgroup of the TSEs in captive animals was identified in zoo animals in Great Britain including species of greater kudu, nyala, gemsbok, the common eland, Arabian and scimitar oryx, an Ankole-Watusi cow, and an American bison. Studies indicate that transmission likely occurred via the consumption of feed supplemented with meat and bone meal, although some animals died after the British ban on ground offal in animal feed. All animals died during the 1990s, with the last death occurring in 1998.
