= Major prion protein =

Protein involved in multiple prion diseases

PRNP
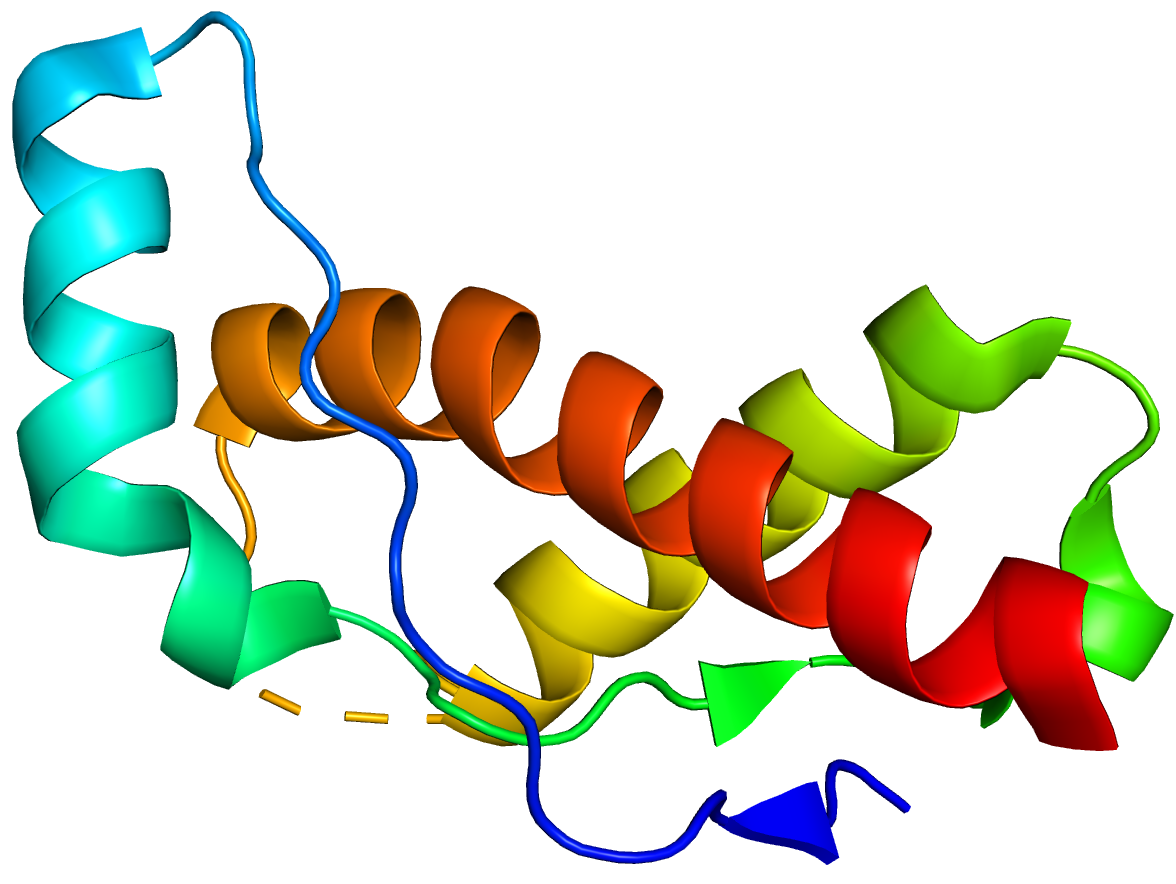

Identifiers
- Aliases: PRNP, ASCR, AltPrP, CD230, CJD, GSS, KURU, PRIP, PrP, PrP27-30, PrP33-35C, PrPc, p27-30, prion protein
- External IDs: OMIM: 176640; MGI: 97769; GeneCards: PRNP
Available structures
| PDB | Ortholog search: PDBe RCSB |
| PDB | List of PDB id codes 1E1G, 1E1J, 1E1P, 1E1S, 1E1U, 1E1W, 1FKC, 1FO7, 1H0L, 1HJM, 1HJN, 1I4M, 1OEH, 1OEI, 1QLX, 1QLZ, 1QM0, 1QM1, 1QM2, 1QM3, 2IV4, 2IV5, 2IV6, 2K1D, 2KUN, 2LBG, 2LEJ, 2LFT, 2LSB, 2LV1, 2OL9, 2W9E, 3HAF, 3HAK, 3HEQ, 3HER, 3HES, 3HJ5, 3HJX, 3MD4, 3MD5, 3NHC, 3NHD, 3NVF, 4DGI, 4E1H, 4E1I,%%s1E1G, 1E1J, 1E1P, 1E1S, 1E1U, 1E1W, 1FKC, 1FO7, 1H0L, 1HJM, 1HJN, 1I4M, 1OEH, 1OEI, 1QLX, 1QLZ, 1QM0, 1QM1, 1QM2, 1QM3, 2IV4, 2IV5, 2IV6, 2K1D, 2KUN, 2LBG, 2LEJ, 2LFT, 2LSB, 2LV1, 2M8T, 2W9E, 3HAF, 3HAK, 3HEQ, 3HER, 3HES, 3HJ5, 3HJX, 3MD4, 3MD5, 3NHC, 3NVF, 4DGI, 4E1H, 4E1I, 4KML, 4N9O |

Gene location (Human)
| Chr. | Chromosome 20 (human) |
| Band | 20p13 | Start | 4,686,350 bp |
| Band | 20p13 | End | 4,701,590 bp |

Gene location (Mouse)
| Chr. | Chromosome 2 (mouse) |
| Band | 2 F2|2 64.07 cM | Start | 131,751,848 bp |
| Band | 2 F2|2 64.07 cM | End | 131,780,349 bp |
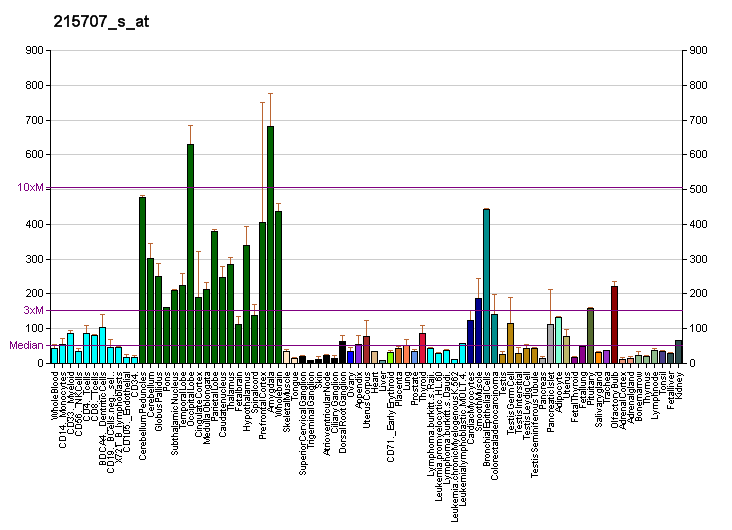

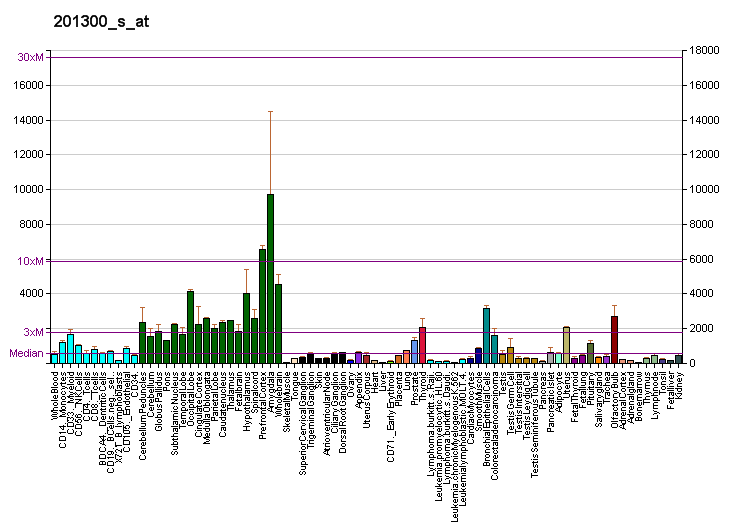
RNA expression pattern
| Bgee | Human / Mouse (ortholog); Top expressed in: Brodmann area 23; Region I of hippocampus proper; retinal pigment epithelium; orbitofrontal cortex; endothelial cell; spinal ganglia; trigeminal ganglion; pons; Epithelium of choroid plexus; pars compacta / Top expressed in: nucleus of stria terminalis; CA3 field; entorhinal cortex; perirhinal cortex; Region I of hippocampus proper; amygdala; decidua; cingulate gyrus; subiculum; anterior amygdaloid area; More reference expression data |
| BioGPS | More reference expression data |
Gene ontology
| Molecular function | chaperone binding; transmembrane transporter binding; microtubule binding; ATP-dependent protein binding; metal ion binding; tubulin binding; protein binding; identical protein binding; copper ion binding; lamin binding; amyloid-beta binding; protease binding; glycosaminoglycan binding; type 5 metabotropic glutamate receptor binding; type 8 metabotropic glutamate receptor binding; signaling receptor activity; protein-containing complex binding; cupric ion binding; cuprous ion binding |
| Cellular component | mitochondrial outer membrane; membrane; mitochondrion; integral component of membrane; cytoplasm; Golgi apparatus; plasma membrane; cell surface; endoplasmic reticulum; membrane raft; anchored component of membrane; extracellular exosome; nucleus; extrinsic component of membrane; cytosol; postsynaptic density; inclusion body; dendrite; anchored component of external side of plasma membrane; nuclear membrane; intracellular membrane-bounded organelle; postsynapse |
| Biological process | negative regulation of protein phosphorylation; negative regulation of interferon-gamma production; response to cadmium ion; negative regulation of calcineurin-NFAT signaling cascade; response to copper ion; negative regulation of apoptotic process; response to oxidative stress; negative regulation of DNA-binding transcription factor activity; negative regulation of T cell receptor signaling pathway; regulation of protein localization; negative regulation of activated T cell proliferation; learning or memory; cellular copper ion homeostasis; cellular response to copper ion; cell cycle; metabolism; negative regulation of interleukin-17 production; protein homooligomerization; negative regulation of interleukin-2 production; regulation of potassium ion transmembrane transport; long-term memory; positive regulation of cell death; negative regulation of protein processing; protein destabilization; activation of protein kinase activity; calcium-mediated signaling using intracellular calcium source; negative regulation of catalytic activity; positive regulation of neuron apoptotic process; regulation of peptidyl-tyrosine phosphorylation; positive regulation of peptidyl-tyrosine phosphorylation; positive regulation of protein tyrosine kinase activity; positive regulation of protein targeting to membrane; dendritic spine maintenance; negative regulation of long-term synaptic potentiation; regulation of glutamate receptor signaling pathway; positive regulation of neuron death; negative regulation of amyloid-beta formation; regulation of intracellular calcium activated chloride channel activity; negative regulation of dendritic spine maintenance; negative regulation of amyloid precursor protein catabolic process; positive regulation of protein localization to plasma membrane; response to amyloid-beta; cellular response to amyloid-beta; regulation of calcium ion import across plasma membrane; neuron projection maintenance |
Sources:Amigo / QuickGO
Orthologs
| Databases | NCBI: entry; OMA: entry |
| Species | Human | Mouse |
| Entrez | 5621 | 19122 |
| Ensembl | ENSG00000171867 | ENSMUSG00000079037 |
| UniProt | P04156 | P04925 |
| RefSeq (mRNA) | NM_183079; NM_000311; NM_001080121; NM_001080122; NM_001080123 NM_001271561 | NM_001278256; NM_011170 |
| RefSeq (protein) | NP_000302; NP_001073590; NP_001073591; NP_001073592; NP_001258490 NP_898902; NP_000302.1; NP_001073590.1; NP_001073591.1; NP_001073592.1; NP_898902.1 | NP_001265185; NP_035300 |
| Location (UCSC) | Chr 20: 4.69 – 4.7 Mb | Chr 2: 131.75 – 131.78 Mb |
| PubMed search |
- Wikidata
| View/Edit Human | View/Edit Mouse |

The major prion protein (PrP) is encoded in the human body by the PRNP gene also known as CD230 (cluster of differentiation 230). Expression of the protein is most prominent in the nervous system but occurs in many other tissues throughout the body.

The protein can exist in multiple isoforms: the normal PrP^{C} form, and the protease-resistant form designated PrP^{Res} such as the disease-causing PrP^{Sc} (scrapie) and an isoform located in mitochondria. The misfolded version PrP^{Sc} is associated with a variety of uniformly fatal neurodegenerative diseases in humans and nonhuman species. In nonhuman species these include ovine scrapie, bovine spongiform encephalopathy (BSE, mad cow disease), feline spongiform encephalopathy, transmissible mink encephalopathy (TME), exotic ungulate encephalopathy, chronic wasting disease (CWD) which affects deer; human prion diseases include Creutzfeldt–Jakob disease (CJD), fatal familial insomnia (FFI), Gerstmann–Sträussler–Scheinker syndrome (GSS), kuru, and variant Creutzfeldt–Jakob disease (vCJD). Similarities exist between kuru, thought to be due to human ingestion of diseased individuals, and vCJD, thought to be due to human ingestion of BSE-tainted cattle products.

== Gene ==
Chromosome 20

The human PRNP gene is located on the short (p) arm of chromosome 20 between the end (terminus) of the arm and position 13, from base pair 4,615,068 to base pair 4,630,233.

== Structure ==
PrP is highly conserved in mammals, lending credence to conclusions derived from experimental animals such as mice. In primates, PrP ranges from 92.9% to 99.6% similarity in amino acid sequences. The 3-dimensional structure of human PrP consists of a globular domain with three α-helices and a two-strand antiparallel β-sheet, an NH_{2}-terminal tail, and a short COOH-terminal tail. A glycophosphatidylinositol (GPI) membrane anchor at the COOH-terminal tethers PrP to cell membranes, and this proves to be integral to the transmission of conformational change; secreted PrP lacking the anchor component is unaffected by the infectious isoform.

The primary sequence of PrP is 253 amino acids long before post-translational modification. Signal sequences in the amino- and carboxy- terminal ends are removed posttranslationally, resulting in a mature length of 208 amino acids. For human and golden hamster PrP, two glycosylated sites exist on helices 2 and 3 at Asn181 and Asn197. Murine PrP has glycosylation sites as Asn180 and Asn196. A disulfide bond exists between Cys179 of the second helix and Cys214 of the third helix (human PrP^{C} numbering).

PrP messenger RNA contains a pseudoknot structure (prion pseudoknot), which is thought to be involved in regulation of PrP protein translation.

=== Ligand-binding ===
The conformational conversion of PrP to the scrapie isoform has been speculated to be linked to an elusive ligand-protein, but, so far, no such agent has been identified. However, a large body of research has developed on candidates and their interaction with the PrP^{C}.

Copper, zinc, manganese, and nickel are confirmed PrP ligands that bind to its octarepeat region. Ligand binding causes a conformational change with unknown effect. Heavy metal binding at PrP has been linked to resistance to oxidative stress arising from heavy metal toxicity.

=== PrP^{C} (normal cellular) isoform ===
The precise function of PrP is not yet known. It may play a role in the transport of ionic copper into cells from the surrounding environment. Researchers have also proposed roles for PrP in cell signaling or in the formation of synapses. PrP^{C} attaches to the outer surface of the cell membrane by a glycosylphosphatidylinositol anchor at its C-terminal Ser231.

PrP contains five octapeptide repeats with sequence PHGGGWGQ (though the first repeat has the slightly modified, histidine-deficient sequence PQGGGGWGQ). This is thought to generate a copper-binding domain via nitrogen atoms in the histidine imidazole side-chains and deprotonated amide nitrogens from the 2nd and 3rd glycines in the repeat. The ability to bind copper is, therefore, pH-dependent. NMR shows copper binding results in a conformational change at the N-terminus.

=== PrP^{Sc} (scrapie) isoform ===
PrP^{Sc} is a conformational isoform of PrP^{C} that tends to accumulate in compact, protease-resistant aggregates within neural tissue. The abnormal PrP^{Sc} isoform has a different secondary and tertiary structure from PrP^{C}, but identical primary sequence. Whereas PrP^{C} has largely alpha helical and disordered domains, PrP^{Sc} has no alpha helix and an amyloid fibril core composed of a stack of PrP molecules bound together by parallel in-register intermolecular beta sheets. This refolding renders the PrP^{Sc} isoform extremely resistant to proteolysis.

The propagation of PrP^{Sc} is a topic of great interest, as its accumulation is linked to neurodegeneration. Based on the progressive nature of spongiform encephalopathies, the predominant hypothesis posits that normal PrP^{C} is compelled to misfold and aggregate due to its interaction with PrP^{Sc}. Strong support for this is taken from studies in which PRNP-knockout mice are resistant to the introduction of PrP^{Sc}. Despite widespread acceptance of the conformation conversion hypothesis, some studies mitigate claims for a direct link between PrP^{Sc} and cytotoxicity.

Polymorphisms at sites 136, 154, and 171 are associated with varying susceptibility to ovine scrapie. (These ovine sites correspond to human sites 133, 151, and 168.) Polymorphisms of the PrP-VRQ form and PrP-ARQ form are associated with increased susceptibility, whereas PrP-ARR is associated with resistance. The National Scrapie Plan of the UK aims to breed out these scrapie polymorphisms by increasing the frequency of the resistant allele. However, PrP-ARR polymorphisms are susceptible to atypical scrapie, so this may prove unfruitful.

== Function ==
=== Nervous system ===
The strong association of PrP with neurodegenerative diseases raises questions as to the normal function of PrP in the brain. A common approach to this problem is to use PrP-knockout ("null") and transgenic mice to investigate deficiencies and differences. Initial attempts produced two strains of PrP-null mice that show no physiological or developmental differences when subjected to an array of tests. However, more recent strains have shown significant cognitive abnormalities. As the PrP-null mice age, a marked loss of Purkinje cells in the cerebellum results in decreased motor coordination. However, this effect is not a direct result of PrP's absence, and rather arises from increased Doppel gene expression. Other observed differences include reduced stress response and increased exploration of novel environments.

Circadian rhythm is altered in null mice. Fatal familial insomnia is thought to be the result of a point mutation in PRNP at codon 178, which corroborates PrP's involvement in sleep-wake cycles. In addition, circadian regulation has been demonstrated in PrP mRNA, which cycles regularly with day-night.

==== Memory ====
While PrP-deficient mice exhibit normal learning ability and short-term memory, long-term memory consolidation deficits have been demonstrated. As with ataxia, this is attributable to Doppel gene expression. However, spatial learning, a function predominantly mediated by the hippocampus, is decreased in the null mice and can be recovered with the reinstatement of PrP in neurons; this indicates that loss of PrP function is the cause. The interaction of hippocampal PrP with laminin (LN) is pivotal in memory processing and is likely modulated by the kinases PKA and ERK1/2.

Further support for PrP's role in memory formation is derived from several population studies. A test of healthy young humans showed increased long-term memory ability associated with an MM or MV genotype when compared to VV. In Down syndrome a single valine substitution has been associated with earlier cognitive decline. Several polymorphisms in PRNP have been linked with cognitive impairment in the elderly as well as earlier cognitive decline. All of these studies investigated differences in codon 129, indicating its importance in the overall functionality of PrP, in particular with regard to memory.

==== Neurons and synapses ====
PrP is present in both the pre- and post-synaptic compartments, with the greatest concentration in the pre-synaptic portion. Considering this and PrP's suite of behavioral influences, the neural cell functions and interactions are of particular interest. Based on the copper ligand, one proposed function casts PrP as a copper buffer for the synaptic cleft. In this role, the protein could serve as either a copper homeostasis mechanism, a calcium modulator, or a sensor for copper or oxidative stress. Loss of PrP function has been linked to long-term potentiation (LTP). This effect can be positive or negative and is due to changes in neuronal excitability and synaptic transmission in the hippocampus.

Some research indicates that PrP is involved in neuronal development, differentiation, and neurite outgrowth. The PrP-activated signal transduction pathway is associated with axon and dendritic outgrowth.

=== Immune system ===
Though most attention is focused on the presence of PrP in the nervous system, it is also abundant in cells of the immune system, including hematopoietic stem cells, mature lymphoid and myeloid compartments, and certain lymphocytes. PrP also has been detected in natural killer cells, platelets, and monocytes. T cell activation is accompanied by a strong up-regulation of PrP, though it is not requisite. The lack of a strong immune response to transmissible spongiform encephalopathies (TSE), neurodegenerative diseases caused by prions, could stem from the tolerance for native PrP^{Sc}.

=== Muscles, liver, and pituitary ===
PrP-null mice provide clues to a role in muscular physiology when subjected to a forced swimming test, which showed reduced locomotor activity. Aging mice with an overexpression of PRNP showed significant degradation of muscle tissue.

Very low levels of PrP exist in the liver and could be associated with liver fibrosis. The presence of PrP in the pituitary has been shown to affect neuroendocrine function in amphibians, but little is known concerning PrP in the mammalian pituitary.

=== Cellular ===
Varying expression of PrP throughout the cell cycle has led to speculation that the protein might be involved in development. Numerous studies have been conducted investigating the role in cell proliferation, differentiation, death, and survival. Engagement of PrP has been linked to activation of signal transduction. Modulation of signal transduction pathways has been demonstrated in cross-linking with antibodies and ligand-binding (hop/STI1 or copper). Given the diversity of interactions, effects, and distribution, PrP has been proposed to be a dynamic surface protein functioning in signaling pathways. Specific sites along the protein bind to other proteins, biomolecules, and metals. These interfaces allow specific sets of cells to communicate based on their level of expression and the surrounding microenvironment. The anchoring of PrP on a GPI raft in the lipid bilayer supports claims of an extracellular scaffolding function.

== Diseases caused by PrP misfolding ==
More than 20 mutations in the PRNP gene have been identified in people with inherited prion diseases, which include the following:

- Creutzfeldt–Jakob disease – glutamic acid-200 is replaced by lysine while valine is present at amino acid 129
- Gerstmann–Sträussler–Scheinker syndrome – usually a change in codon 102 from proline to leucine
- Fatal familial insomnia – aspartic acid-178 is replaced by asparagine while methionine is present at amino acid 129

The conversion of PrP^{C} to the PrP^{Sc} conformation is the mechanism by which the transmissible spongiform encephalopathies (TSEs) are transmitted. This can arise from genetic factors, infection from external sources, or spontaneously for unknown reasons. Accumulation of PrP^{Sc} corresponds with progression of neurodegeneration and is the proposed cause. Some PRNP mutations lead to a change in single amino acids (the building-blocks of proteins) in the prion protein. Others insert additional amino acids into the protein or cause an abnormally short protein to be made. These mutations cause the cell to make prion proteins with an abnormal structure. The abnormal protein PrP^{Sc} accumulates in the brain and destroys nerve cells, which leads to the mental and behavioral features of prion diseases.

Several other changes in the PRNP gene (called polymorphisms) do not cause prion diseases but may affect a person's risk of developing these diseases or alter the course of the disorders. An allele that codes for a PRNP variant, G127V, provides resistance to kuru.

In addition, some prion diseases can be transmitted from external sources of PrP^{Sc}.

- Scrapie – fatal neurodegenerative disease in sheep, not transmissible to humans
- Bovine spongiform encephalopathy (mad-cow disease) – fatal neurodegenerative disease in cows, which can be transmitted to humans by ingestion of brain, spinal, or digestive tract tissue from an infected cow
- Kuru – TSE in humans, transmitted via funerary cannibalism. Generally, affected family members were given, by tradition, parts of the central nervous system according to ritual when consuming deceased family members.

=== Alzheimer's disease ===
PrP^{C} protein is one of several cellular receptors of soluble amyloid beta (Aβ) oligomers, which are implicated in causing Alzheimer's disease (AD). These oligomers are composed of a small and variable number of Aβ monomers, and they have been shown to be damaging to neurons. The precise mechanism by which soluble Aβ oligomers cause neurotoxicity is unknown, and experimental deletion of PRNP in animals has yielded conflicting findings. When Aβ oligomers were injected into the cerebral ventricles of a mouse model of AD, PRNP deletion did not offer protection, although anti-PrP^{C} antibodies prevented deficits in long-term memory and spatial learning. This would suggest either an unequal relation between PRNP and Aβ oligomer-mediated neurodegeneration or a site-specific relational significance. In the case of direct injection of Aβ oligomers into the hippocampus, PRNP-knockout mice were found to be indistinguishable from control with respect to both neuronal death rates and measurements of synaptic plasticity. It was further found that Aβ-oligomers bind to PrP^{C} at the postsynaptic density, indirectly overactivating the NMDA receptor via the Fyn enzyme, resulting in excitotoxicity. Soluble Aβ oligomers also bind to PrP^{C} at the dendritic spines, forming a complex with Fyn and excessively activating tau, another protein implicated in AD. As the gene FYN codes for the enzyme Fyn, FYN-knockout mice display neither excitotoxic events nor dendritic spine shrinkage when injected with Aβ oligomers. In mammals, the full functional significance of PRNP remains unclear, as PRNP deletion has been prophylactically implemented by the cattle industry without apparent harm. In mice, this same deletion phenotypically varies between AD mouse lines, as hAPPJ20 mice and TgCRND8 mice show a slight increase in epileptic activity, contributing to conflicting results when examining AD survival rates. Of note, the deletion of PRNP in both APPswe and SEN1dE9 mice, two other transgenic models of AD, attenuated the epilepsy-induced death phenotype seen in a subset of these animals. Taken collectively, recent evidence suggests that PRNP may be important for mediating the neurotoxic effects of soluble Aβ-oligomers and the emergent disease state of AD.

In humans, the methionine/valine polymorphism at codon 129 of PRNP (rs1799990) is most closely associated with AD. Variant V allele carriers (VV and MV) show a 13% decreased risk with respect to developing AD compared to the methionine homozygote (MM). However, the risk protective effects of variant V carriers have been found exclusively in Caucasian-categorized study subjects over the age of 65, while early-onset Alzheimer's disease risk and risk of all AD in individuals categorized as "Asian" was not mediated, suggesting a polygenic interaction. PRNP can also functionally interact with polymorphisms in two other genes implicated in AD, PSEN1 and APOE, to compound risk for both AD and sporadic Creutzfeldt–Jakob disease. A point mutation in codon 102 of PRNP at least in part contributed to three separate patients' atypical frontotemporal dementia within the same family, suggesting a new phenotype for Gerstmann–Sträussler–Scheinker syndrome. The same study proposed sequencing PRNP in cases of ambiguously diagnosed dementia, as the various forms of dementia can prove challenging to differentially diagnose.

== Research ==
Cattle have been generated that lack PrP^{C} and are resistant to prion propagation with no apparent developmental abnormalities. In addition to being a source of bovine products free of prion proteins, another use of PrP-null cattle could be the production of human pharmaceuticals in their blood without the danger that those products might be contaminated with the infectious agent that causes mad cow disease.

== Interactions ==
A strong interaction exists between PrP and the cochaperone Hop (Hsp70/Hsp90 organizing protein; also called STI1 (Stress-induced protein 1)).
