= Transmissible spongiform encephalopathy =

Group of brain diseases induced by prions

Prion diseases
- Other names: Transmissible spongiform encephalopathy (TSE)
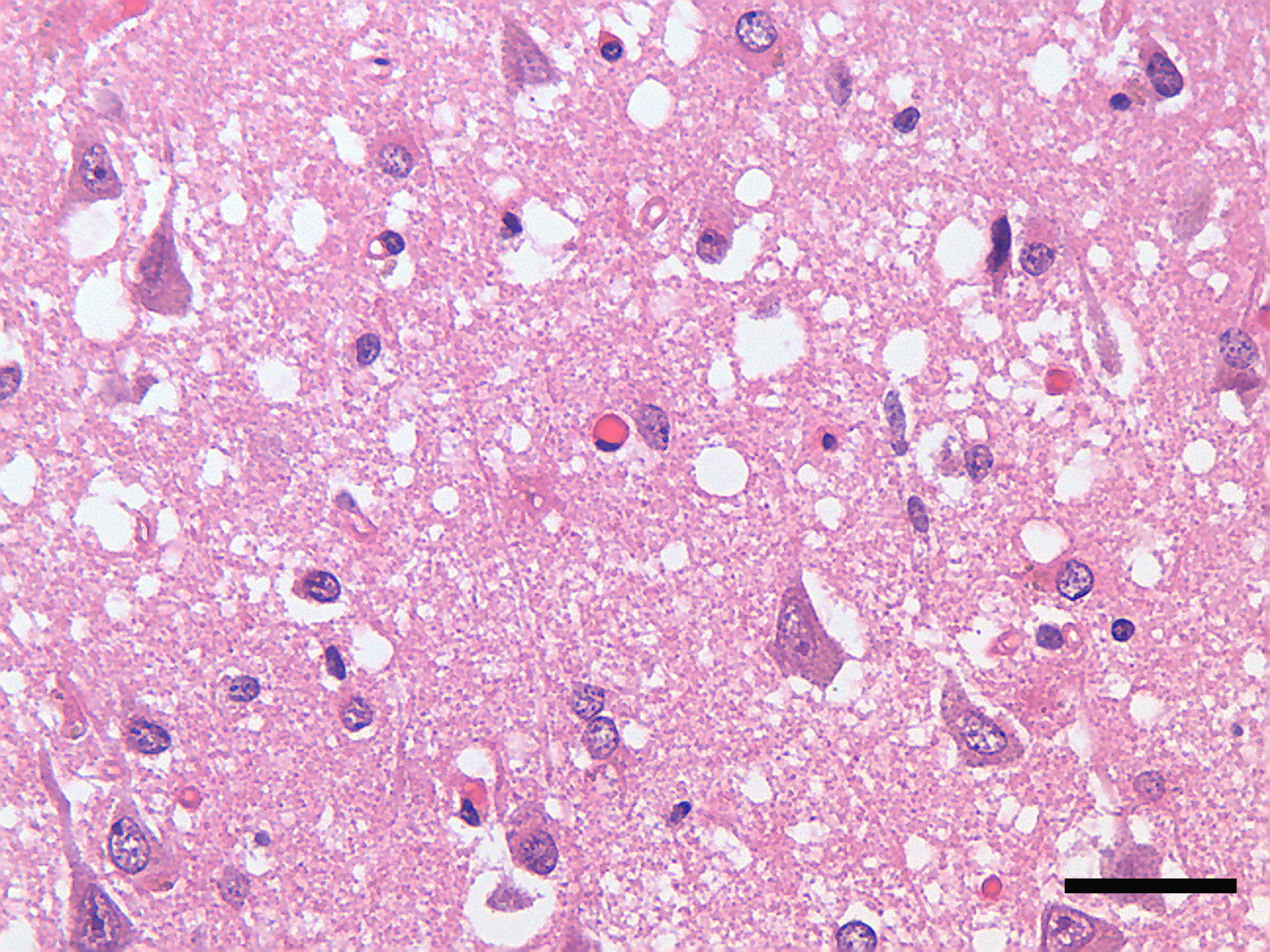
- Micrograph showing spongiform degeneration (vacuoles that appear as holes in tissue sections) in the cerebral cortex of a patient who had died of Creutzfeldt–Jakob disease. H&E stain, scale bar = 30 microns (0.03 mm).
- Specialty: Infectious diseases
- Symptoms: dementia, seizures, tremors, insomnia, psychosis, delirium, confusion
- Usual onset: 6 months to 30 years
- Types: bovine spongiform encephalopathy, fatal insomnia, Creutzfeldt–Jakob disease, kuru, Huntington's disease-like 1, scrapie, variably protease-sensitive prionopathy, chronic wasting disease, Gerstmann–Sträussler–Scheinker syndrome, feline spongiform encephalopathy, transmissible mink encephalopathy, exotic ungulate encephalopathy, camel spongiform encephalopathy, PrP systemic amyloidosis, familial Alzheimer-like prion disease
- Causes: Prion
- Risk factors: Contact with infected fluids, ingestion of infected flesh, having one or two parents that have the disease (in case of fatal familial insomnia)
- Diagnostic method: Prions can be detected by testing CSF via spinal tap
- Prevention: Gene editing of children at risk (for familial prion diseases), not eating contaminated flesh (variant Creutzfeldt–Jakob disease, kuru), proper sterilization of medical tools (iatrogenic Creutzfeldt–Jakob disease)
- Treatment: Palliative care
- Medication: Various experimental treatments, for pain relief: morphine, methadone
- Prognosis: Invariably fatal
- Frequency: Less than 1% of all dementia cases

Transmissible spongiform encephalopathies (TSEs), or prion diseases, are a group of rare, progressive, incurable, and invariably fatal conditions that cause degeneration of the nervous system in humans and other animals, such as cattle and sheep. Prion diseases are caused by abnormally shaped proteins called prions, an idea once considered radical, but now well supported by evidence. Prions consist of a protein called the major prion protein (PrP). Misshapen PrP conveys its abnormal structure to native PrP molecules by a crystallization-like seeding process (a process where misfolded proteins convert normal ones into the same abnormal shape). Because PrP is continuously produced by a cell and the abnormal proteins stick to each other, they accumulate in the brain, damaging neurons and eventually causing disease.

Prion diseases cause worsening mental and physical deterioration over time, such as confusion, trouble waking, and loss of coordination. A key pathologic characteristic of prion diseases is the formation of small empty spaces (vacuoles) throughout various parts of the central nervous system, like the brain and spinal cord, giving the tissue a sponge-like appearance under a microscope. Affected regions also show a buildup of misfolded PrP, abnormal growth of support cells (gliosis), and the loss of neurons.

In animals, prion diseases include scrapie in sheep, bovine spongiform encephalopathy (BSE) in cattle (popularly known as "mad cow disease"), chronic wasting disease (CWD) in deer and elk, and others. In humans, they include Creutzfeldt–Jakob disease, Gerstmann–Sträussler–Scheinker syndrome, fatal familial insomnia, kuru, and variably protease-sensitive prionopathy. Creutzfeldt–Jakob disease has been divided into four subtypes: sporadic (idiopathic), hereditary, iatrogenic, and variant. These diseases form a spectrum of related conditions with overlapping signs and symptoms.

Prion diseases are unusual because they can be genetic, infectious, or idiopathic. Genetic (inherited) prion diseases result from rare mutations in PRNP, the gene that codes for PrP. Unlike conventional infectious diseases, which are spread by agents with a DNA or RNA genome (such as viruses or bacteria), prion diseases are transmitted by prions, the active material of which is solely abnormal PrP. Infection can occur when the organism is exposed to prions through consuming contaminated food or via iatrogenic means (such as treatment with biological material that is accidentally contaminated with prions). The variant form of Creutzfeldt–Jakob disease in humans is caused by exposure to BSE prions. While prion diseases spread relatively easily among animals, transmission to humans is very rare. Most people who develop prion disease were never exposed to an infected animal or contaminated material; in the majority of cases, there is no identifiable cause. Sporadic prion diseases occur in the absence of a mutation in the gene for PrP or a source of infection.

Although research has shown that the ability of prions to cause infection depends on the shape of abnormal PrP, auxiliary substances likely contribute to their formation and/or infectivity. In a protein misfolding cyclic amplification (PMCA) assay, purified PrP^{C} cannot convert into the infectious PrP form, unless other components are added, such as a polyanion (usually RNA) and lipids. Other components, known as cofactors, may form part of the infectious prion, or act as catalysts for the replication of a protein-only prion. Considering that the cofactors can be produced by chemical synthesis instead of being sourced solely from infected cases (or any animal at all), it is fair to say that they do not form the infectious part of the prion. However, these catalysts (especially the polyanion) do have a tendency to be included in the prion aggregate, which makes seeding new aggregates easier in vitro.

== Classification ==
Prion diseases can be classified according to the characteristics of the prions that are involved in each type of disease. PrP^{C} refers to "Cellular" PrP, the normal form of the protein that is not misfolded. PrP^{Sc} refers to the scrapie-associated form of PrP, Other generic terms for disease-associated PrP are PrP^{Res} ("Res" stands for "Resistant" to protease), and PrP^{D} ("D" for "Disease"). In the Table below, different prion types are classified based on the disease to which they are linked. Differences in shape among the different prion protein forms are incompletely understood, although new methods such as cryo-electron microscopy are beginning to address this problem.

Known spongiform encephalopathies
ICTVdb Code	Disease name	Natural host	Prion name	PrP isoform	Ruminant
Non-human mammals
90.001.0.01.001.	Scrapie	Sheep and goats	Scrapie prion	PrP^{Sc}	Yes
90.001.0.01.002.	Transmissible mink encephalopathy (TME)	Mink	TME prion	PrP^{TME}	No
90.001.0.01.003.	Chronic wasting disease (CWD)	Elk, white-tailed deer, mule deer and red deer	CWD prion	PrP^{CWD}	Yes
90.001.0.01.004.	Bovine spongiform encephalopathy (BSE) commonly known as "mad cow disease"	Cattle	BSE prion	PrP^{BSE}	Yes
90.001.0.01.005.	Feline spongiform encephalopathy (FSE)	Cats	FSE prion	PrP^{FSE}	No
90.001.0.01.006.	Exotic ungulate encephalopathy (EUE)	Nyala and greater kudu	EUE prion	PrP^{EUE}	Yes
	Camel spongiform encephalopathy (CSE)	Camel		PrP^{CSE}	Yes
Human diseases
90.001.0.01.007.	Kuru	Humans	Kuru prion	PrP^{Kuru}	No
90.001.0.01.008.	Creutzfeldt–Jakob disease (CJD)	Humans	CJD prion	PrP^{sCJD}	No
	Variant Creutzfeldt–Jakob disease (vCJD, nvCJD)	Humans	vCJD prion	PrP^{vCJD}	
90.001.0.01.009.	Gerstmann–Sträussler–Scheinker syndrome (GSS)	Humans	GSS prion	PrP^{GSS}	No
90.001.0.01.010.	Fatal insomnia (FFI)	Humans	FFI prion	PrP^{FFI}	No
	Familial spongiform encephalopathy	Humans			

== Pathology ==
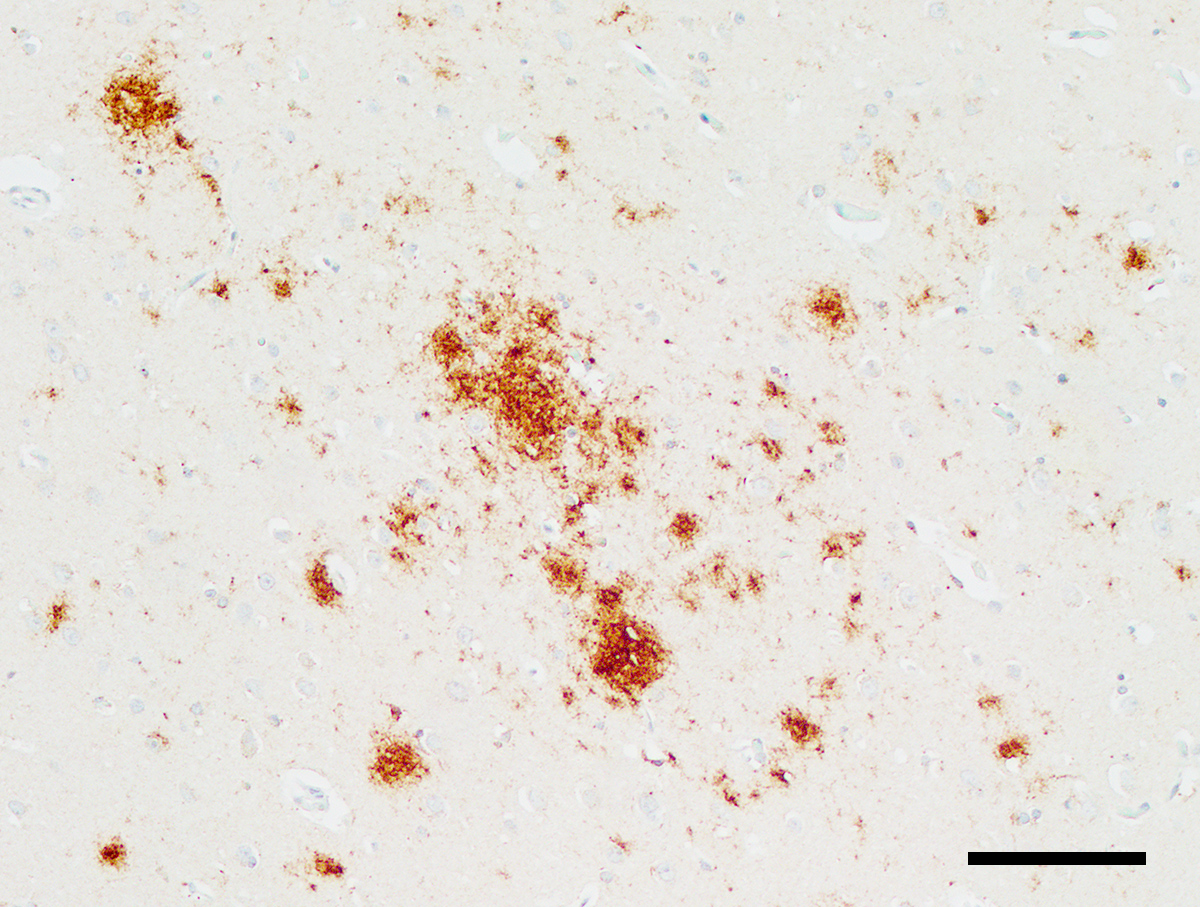
Micrograph of prion protein (PrP) deposition (brown) in the cerebral cortex of a person who had died with Creutzfeldt–Jakob disease (CJD). Immunohistochemical stain for PrP; Nissl counterstain (blue); scale bar = 100 microns (0.1mm).

The degenerative tissue damage caused by prion disease in the nervous system is characterized by four features:

- Spongiform change (the presence of many small vacuoles)
- The death of neurons
- Astrocytosis (abnormal increase in the number of astrocytes)
- Deposits of abnormal PrP (some of which have the characteristics of amyloid).

These neuropathological features have long been used to diagnose of prion diseases. However, the specific patterns can vary between cases and within different regions of the central nervous system. In humans, prion diseases with different genetic or infectious causes often show distinct pathological features.

For instance, amyloid plaque formation is uncommon in most prion diseases, but is more frequently observed in certain diseases, such as kuru and variant Creutzfeldt–Jakob disease (vCJD). In rare cases, prion diseases may show tauopathy similar to that seen in Alzheimer's disease, highlighting the variability in disease presentations.

Despite this variation, all prion diseases share the common feature of abnormal prion protein accumulation in the nervous system.

== Signs and symptoms ==
The clinical signs of prion diseases in humans vary, but the most common signs, especially of sporadic Creutzfeldt–Jakob disease (CJD) include:

- Rapidly progressive dementia
- Behavioral abnormalities and psychiatric symptoms
- Loss of coordination and/or an unsteady gait (ataxia)
- Involuntary jerking movements (myoclonus).
- Unusual sensations, insomnia, and confusion

Prion diseases typically progress rapidly once symptoms appear. For example, the average survival time for people with CJD is about six months, although some individuals may live for a year or longer. All prion diseases are ultimately fatal.

Research on inherited and acquired (infectious) prion disease shows that this short symptomatic period is usually preceded by a long silent phase, during which the abnormal prion proteins gradually accumulate in the brain without causing noticeable symptoms. In some cases this silent phase can last for decades; for instance, the incubation period for kuru can exceed 50 years.

Because the signs and symptoms of prion diseases vary widely and often resemble those of other neurological disorders, diagnosis based on clinical features alone is challenging.

== Genetics ==
Only 10–15% of human prion disease cases are heritable; most of them occur sporadically, that is, in the absence of known genetic mutations or infection. However, discovery of the gene involved in heritable prion diseases was a critical event in linking abnormalities of the prion protein to genetic, infectious and idiopathic prion diseases. All familial forms of prion disease are caused by inherited mutations in the PRNP gene, which codes for PrP.

Mutations in the PRNP gene can cause prion diseases. These include:

- Point mutations that alter a single amino acid
- Insertions or repeat expansions that lengthen the protein
- Mutations that lead to premature stop codons

These mutations increase the likelihood that the prion protein (PrP) will misfold into the wrong shape and accumulate in the nervous system. Different mutations can cause prion diseases with different clinical and pathological characteristics.

The normal function of PrP is not fully understood, but it is believed to play a role in cellular processes and is widely expressed throughout the body, particularly in the nervous system. When the PRNP gene is inactivated in animals such as mice, cattle and goats, the PrP-deficient animals are resistant to prion infection. Other mammals, like canids, also appear to be immune against prion infection. Although the absence of a functional PRNP gene can result in changes in various tissues, the animals are viable and appear to be relatively normal, at least at young ages.

== Infectivity ==
Scrapie was suspected to be infectious among sheep in the earliest days from which reliable reports are available. However, it wasn't until the 1930s that the inoculation experiments of Jean Cuillé and Paul-Louis Chelle convincingly demonstrated the infectivity of scrapie (see History, below).

The 1959 exhibition at the Wellcome Medical Museum in London featured the neuropathology of kuru, provided by Igor Klatzko of the NINDS . Whilst attending that exhibit, William Hadlow recognised striking similarities between the neuropathology of scrapie and kuru.

As a consequence Hadlow wrote to D. Carleton Gajdusek enclosing in that correspondence his letter to the Lancet, which recommended injecting primates with infected tissue. The shared features of these human and nonhuman diseases prompted Gajdusek to conduct a series of experiments in which he demonstrated that human spongiform encephalopathies are transmissible to nonhuman primates. His research group reported the transmissibility of kuru in 1966, Creutzfeldt–Jakob disease (CJD) in 1968, and Gerstmann–Sträussler–Scheinker syndrome (GSS) in 1981. These experiments showed that human spongiform encephalopathies, like those in nonhuman species, can be infectious; because the diseases have an unusually long incubation period following exposure to the infectious agent, the agent was sometimes referred to as a 'slow virus'. The infectious agent was not shown with reasonable certainty to be primarily a protein until the work of Stanley Prusiner gave rise to the prion concept in 1982.

Infectious prion diseases in humans are uncommon and decreasing in incidence. Iatrogenic versions have been recognized since the 1980s: Creutzfeldt–Jakob disease has been inadvertently transmitted to patients via injections of growth hormone harvested from human cadaveric pituitary glands, via cadaveric dural allografts, and (more rarely) via corneal transplants, transfusion of blood products, and exposure to contaminated instruments used for brain surgery. Prions can survive heating in the autoclave, a method used for the conventional sterilization of surgical instruments. For this reason, special precautions need to be taken to ensure the complete sterility of neurosurgical instruments.

Dietary consumption of affected animal parts can transmit prion disease, especially in nonhuman species in which infectious prion diseases are relatively common. In these instances, how the agent gains wider access to the body is not entirely clear; besides the apparent transmission of prions via the alimentary tract, transmissible spongiform encephalopathies may be naturally acquired when prion-containing material comes in contact with damaged tissues such as the gums, skin, or conjunctiva. Early studies suggest that plants can be vessels for prion transmission if an infected plant is consumed. It was demonstrated in certain plant species, such as those that animals feed on, like alfalfa and barley, among others. The roots can absorb prions released into the soil from previously deceased, infected animals and transfer them throughout the plant. In turn, this can infect the animal that consumes the prion-containing species.

In humans, infection via consumption is very rare, two well-known examples being kuru and variant Creutzfeldt–Jakob disease (vCJD). Kuru is a (now extinct) prion disease that reached epidemic proportions in the mid-20th century in the Fore people of Papua New Guinea. Until the practice was abandoned in the mid-20th century, the Fore people would consume their dead as a funerary ritual. With the cessation of ritual cannibalism, new cases of Kuru slowly ceased to appear. A more well-known infectious human prion disease is vCJD, a zoonotic prion disease that is caused by the consumption of tissues from cows with bovine spongiform encephalopathy (BSE). Cows are thought to have acquired BSE by consuming food that contained meat products derived from animals with prion disease, possibly sheep with scrapie. Fortunately, vCJD has largely been eliminated by efforts to exclude tainted meat products from the food chain. Regulations in many developed countries now ban the use of rendered ruminant proteins in ruminant feed as a precaution against the spread of prion infection in cattle and other animals.

Prions cannot be transmitted through the air, through touching, or by most other forms of casual contact. However, they may be transmitted through contact with infected tissue, bodily fluids, or contaminated medical instruments. Normal sterilization procedures, such as boiling or irradiating materials, fail to render prions non-infective. However, treatment with strong, almost undiluted bleach and/or sodium hydroxide, or heating to a minimum of 134 °C, does destroy prions.

Epidemiological surveillance has identified cases of atypical bovine spongiform encephalopathy (BSE) and scrapie in livestock, as well as chronic wasting disease (CWD) in cervids, highlighting the zoonotic potential of prion diseases and their impact on animal and human health.

== Other hypotheses ==
The infectious protein hypothesis has become the prevailing explanation for the causation of prion diseases. However, in the years following the recognition of their infectivity, other hypotheses regarding the infectious agent have been proposed. These include unorthodox forms of carbohydrates, lipids, nucleic acids, or unusual or cryptic infectious agents. With respect to causation by nucleic acid-based infectious agents, a hypothesis championed by Laura Manuelidis invokes a cryptic viral agent, and another proposed by Frank O. Bastian holds that Spiroplasma infection, specifically Spiroplasma mirum, is a cause of transmissible spongiform encephalopathies. However, no alternative hypothesis has garnered sufficient support to displace the prion paradigm.

== Diagnosis ==
The variable presentation of prion diseases and their rapid progression following the appearance of signs and symptoms present a special challenge for diagnosis. Because the early signs of disease can mimic those in other brain disorders, the diagnosis of prion disease is often delayed. Upon clinical examination, sporadic CJD (the most frequent human prion disease) is suspected when the patient presents with rapidly progressing deterioration of cognition and movement. The diagnosis can be supported by the following tests: 1) Electroencephalogram (EEG) - in CJD, the pattern of brain waves changes over the course of the disease, one typical abnormality being periodic sharp and slow wave complexes in the electrical signal; 2) Cerebrospinal fluid (CSF) tests, in particular, measurement of the 14-3-3 protein, tau protein, and neurofilament light chain, all of which increase in prion diseases; 3) Magnetic resonance imaging (MRI) can detect characteristic changes in the structure of the brain; and 4) Real-time Quaking Induced Conversion (RT-QuIC) is used to detect the presence of abnormal PrP in the CSF. Although many of the changes detected by these tests occur in other diseases, combining the test results can establish the presence of prion disease with high sensitivity and specificity. False positive diagnoses, though rare, are still possible; therefore, definitive diagnosis of prion diseases requires direct examination of brain tissue.

== Treatment ==
There are currently no known ways to cure or prevent prion disease. Supportive care is the only option for easing the burden of the disease in affected individuals. Certain medications, such as PSPs, tetracycline, and doxicycline, have been studied experimentally to treat CJD, but their results vary and are generally disappointing. PRN100, a monoclonal antibody, has been overlooked as an emerging treatment that has been shown to lengthen the lifespan of lab mice to a normal lifespan; their effectiveness in humans is still being studied. In 2024, Sonia Vallabh and her husband described CHARM, a protein which was engineered to selectively silence PrnP, the gene that causes prion diseases, which was found to prolong the lives of rats with the disease by 52% in 2025.

== Epidemiology ==
Prion diseases are unique in medicine in that they can be sporadic, genetic, or infectious in origin. There are a number of different prion diseases of humans and nonhuman species, each with its own characteristics (such as the primary host species, incidence, disease course, and pathology). In humans, the most common prion disease is CJD, which is estimated to occur worldwide in 1 to 2 persons per million per year. Of these, approximately 85% are sporadic, 10-15% are genetic, and less than 1% are acquired by infection. The incidence of sCJD increases with age, and it is most likely to appear between the ages of 55 and 75. Although there may be subtle sex differences, males and females appear to be affected at a similar rate. Analyses in several countries suggest that the incidence of sCJD has risen in recent years. This increase may be due in part to improved detection of the disease, although the growing elderly population is also a possible factor. Much less common sporadic prion diseases include sporadic fatal insomnia (sFI) and variably protease-sensitive prionopathy (VPSPr).

Genetic (heritable) human prion diseases are caused by changes in the PRNP gene, which codes for PrP. Three main categories of genetic prion disease are genetic Creutzfeldt–Jakob disease (gCJD), Gerstmann–Sträussler–Scheinker syndrome (GSS), and fatal familial insomnia (FFI). Of these, the most frequently occurring type is gCJD, whereas FFI is extremely rare. In addition to the mutations in PRNP that cause disease, there are variations in the PRNP gene that can increase or decrease the likelihood of developing all three aetiological subtypes of prion disease (genetic, infectious, and sporadic).

Infectious prion diseases in humans are very rare, historically accounting for less than 1% of cases; they include kuru, iatrogenic CJD (iCJD), and variant CJD (vCJD). Humans have been exposed to prions via contaminated foodstuffs, human cadaver-derived biologics (cadaveric hormones or cadaveric tissue grafts), or contaminated surgical instruments. From 1957 until 2004, more than 2700 cases of kuru among the Fore people of Papua New Guinea were documented. With the cessation of endocannibalism beginning in the 1950s, the number of cases began to decline, and today the disease is considered to be eradicated.

Of the approximately 500 cases of known iatrogenic CJD, most have been recipients of cadaveric pituitary hormones (200 cases, mostly in France) or cadaveric dura mater grafts (over 200 cases, mostly in Japan). The rest of the iCJD cases have been very uncommon; these have involved corneal transplants (2-10 cases), intracranial exposure to contaminated EEG electrodes (2 cases), exposure to contaminated surgical instruments (4 cases), or transfusion of blood (3 cases).

The variant form of CJD resulted from exposure of humans to prion-infected meat from cows with BSE. As of 2021, a total of 232 cases of vCJD had been reported worldwide. Of these, most were in the United Kingdom (178 cases) and France (28 cases), with the remaining 26 cases appearing in various other countries. All but one of these vCJD patients had a specific polymorphism (MM) at codon 129 of the PRNP gene, underscoring the importance of this gene locus as a modifier of susceptibility to prion disease. Removal of cattle with prion disease from the food chain has brought the vCJD crisis to an end, although there is still some concern that people with certain polymorphisms of PRNP may yet develop disease after a longer incubation period. In general, an improved understanding of prions and their transmissibility has greatly reduced the risk of infectious human prion diseases.

In nonhuman species, the epidemiology of prion diseases differs from that in humans in that most cases are infectious in origin. Scrapie can be transmitted among sheep and goats in captivity, and chronic wasting disease (CWD) is unusual in that it is spreading both in captive and wild cervid populations, especially in North America. CWD was first identified in captive cervids in Colorado (USA) in 1967, and its distribution has since expanded to include many areas of North America as well as other countries. CWD is highly infectious, and it is transmissible via direct contact between animals or by contact with prion-contaminated materials. Infected animals can shed prions in saliva, feces, and urine into the environment, and the prions can remain infectious for years thereafter.

Other nonhuman prion diseases have mostly resulted from feeding animals prion-contaminated food; in addition to BSE, these include transmissible mink encephalopathy, exotic ungulate spongiform encephalopathy, and feline spongiform encephalopathy. In the 1980s and 1990s, bovine spongiform encephalopathy (BSE, or "mad cow disease") spread in cattle at an epidemic rate, mostly in the UK. How the first cases of BSE arose is not known, but the epidemic was driven by feeding cattle meat and bone meal that contained the processed remains of infected animals. The bovine epidemic peaked in 1992 at 37,000 confirmed cases; as a result of a ban on feeding meat and bone meal to cattle, the numbers declined to single digits after 2011. Human consumption of meat from BSE-infected cattle caused an outbreak of variant CJD (see above). In the case of some newly emerging (or newly discovered) nonhuman prion diseases, such as CWD in Scandinavia and a prion disease of camels, the origins are sometimes unknown. While the transmission of prion disease from nonhumans to humans appears to be uncommon, the potential for zoonotic infection was highlighted by the BSE epidemic, and this possibility remains a concern among public health specialists.

== History ==
=== First reports of scrapie in sheep ===
The early history of transmissible spongiform encephalopathies is essentially the history of scrapie. Diseases similar to prion diseases were described in ancient texts, but it is unclear if these were truly transmissible spongiform encephalopathies. The ascertainable history of transmissible spongiform encephalopathies begins with a German language description of scrapie in 1750 and an English report in the British House of Commons in 1755. At the time, scrapie was better known among farmers and shepherds than veterinarians, in part because those who relied on the animals for their livelihood were encouraged to hide disease in their flocks from the authorities. Based on the scanty literature of the time, scrapie was present in sheep herds at least as early as 1732.

A report by J.G. Leopoldt in 1750 clearly remarks that scrapie is contagious: "Therefore, the very best a shepherd can do who has caught sight of an animal that has fallen ill with scrapie, is to cull the animal and slaughter it for the nobleman's servants. Thus, it is advisable for a shepherd to immediately separate such an animal from the healthy live-stock, as this disease is contagious and can cause great damage to the flock". Nevertheless, many other causes of scrapie were suspected, including (among others) miasmata, atmospheric conditions, nutrition, age, inbreeding, and sexual characteristics of the rams. The confusion is clearly shown in a quote from the French veterinarian Roche-Lubin in 1848 (cited by Maxime Schwartz): "In our land, the causes of scrapie are excessive copulation by rams; the rough fighting in which they engage among themselves; the sustained use of feeds that arouse them; leaping; violent exertion; rapid running when chased by dogs; loud thunder; bright sunshine in the first few days after shearing; and the frequent recurrence of heat among infertile [females]."

=== Discovery of spongiform change in scrapie ===
Another key event in the history of transmissible spongiform encephalopathies was the discovery of spongiform change (vacuolation) in the nervous system of sheep by Charles Besnoit and colleagues in the late 1890s. Prior investigations had failed to identify pathologic features that were linked to the disease. Recognizing this brain damage as a key feature of scrapie was a critical step toward the pathological definition of the transmissible spongiform encephalopathies in general.

=== Discovery of human spongiform encephalopathy ===
Hans Gerhard Creutzfeldt presented a case report of an unusual neurodegenerative disease in 1920, and this was followed by a description of five cases in 1921 that Alfons Maria Jakob felt were similar to Creutzfeldt's. Walther Spielmeyer in 1922 then named the disease "Creutzfeldt–Jakob disease". Later, researchers found that Creutzfeldt's original case was likely not a spongiform encephalopathy, but two of Jakob's first five cases were confirmed as what is now called Creutzfeldt–Jakob disease. Although Jakob can be considered to have priority of discovery, "Creutzfeldt–Jakob disease" (CJD) remains the most frequently used name for the disease, especially in the English language literature.

=== Proof that scrapie is transmissible ===
Prior to the 1930s, several scientists attempted to transmit scrapie by the introduction of diseased tissues into healthy sheep, but the experiments failed, possibly because the researchers did not account for the very long incubation period of scrapie. Transmissibility was only established with certainty in the 1930s by experiments in which Jean Cuillé and Paul-Louis Chelle placed tissues from sick animals into healthy sheep. Recognizing the unusually long incubation period for normally acquired scrapie, Cuillé and Chelle succeeded where others had failed by waiting more than a year for disease to appear. Their experiments were the first to strongly implicate some type of infectious agent in the transmission of scrapie. In 1961, Richard Chandler reported the transmission of scrapie to mice; the availability of a smaller, shorter-lived animal model (compared to sheep and goats) significantly accelerated subsequent investigations of disease mechanisms.

=== Proof that human spongiform encephalopathies are transmissible ===
Based on Hadlow's recognition of the similarities between kuru and scrapie, Daniel Carleton Gajdusek went on to demonstrate the transmissibility of kuru, CJD, and Gerstmann–Sträussler–Scheinker syndrome to nonhuman primates. Because of its rarity, Creutzfeldt–Jakob disease was little known prior to the discovery that human spongiform encephalopathies are transmissible. The work of Gajdusek, in collaboration with researchers such as William Hadlow, Igor Klatzo, Elizabeth Beck, Michael Alpers and Clarence J. Gibbs, brought together two previously separate lines of research: one in veterinary medicine and the other in human medicine. In 1976, Gajdusek shared the Nobel Prize in Physiology or Medicine with Baruch S. Blumberg "for their discoveries concerning new mechanisms for the origin and dissemination of infectious diseases". The transmissibility of spongiform encephalopathies to humans was further substantiated by the BSE crisis and the discovery of iatrogenic forms of prion disease (see Epidemiology, above).

=== Evidence that the infectious agent is unusual ===
In the 1960s, researchers began to confirm longstanding suspicions that the TSEs were caused by an extraordinary infectious agent: Iain Pattison demonstrated the resistance of the scrapie agent to heat and formaldehyde (which destroy most microbes and viruses) and, using ultraviolet and electron irradiation, Tikvah Alper concluded that the agent was extremely small, and that it was unlikely that it replicated via nucleic acids. Around this time, John Stanley Griffith published a short commentary in which he proposed three ways in which an infectious agent might replicate without nucleic acids. Griffith's 'second way' proposed that a normally produced cellular protein might adopt an abnormal shape that replicates by converting like proteins into the same shape, a hypothesis that anticipated the formalization of the prion concept in the 1980s.

=== The prion principle is established ===
In 1982, Stanley Prusiner coined the word 'prion' to refer to infectious agents that consisted primarily or exclusively of proteins. Research in the following years demonstrated that PrP is normally produced in the body and that mutations of PRNP are associated with prion diseases. The public health importance of prions as infectious agents was underscored by the BSE crisis and iatrogenic prion disease in humans. In 1997, Stanley Prusiner was awarded the Nobel Prize in Physiology or Medicine 'for his discovery of Prions - a new biological principle of infection'. In the 21st century, this research has expanded with the discovery that several (non-infectious) diseases involving the accumulation of abnormal proteins may be caused by a similar molecular mechanism. These include degenerative disorders such as Alzheimer's disease, Parkinson's disease, amyotrophic lateral sclerosis, Lewy body dementia, tauopathies, systemic amyloidoses and others.

== See also ==
- Proteinopathy
- Variably protease-sensitive prionopathy
