= Transmissible mink encephalopathy =

Prion disease of mink

Transmissible mink encephalopathy (TME) is a rare sporadic disease that affects the central nervous system of ranch-raised adult mink. It is a transmissible spongiform encephalopathy, caused by proteins called prions.

== Clinical signs ==
This illness has a minimum incubation period of 7 months with a maximum of 12 months. This disease results in mortality of adult animals.

Clinical signs of TME include behavioural changes such as confusion, loss of cleanliness, and aimless circling. An affected animal shows signs of weight loss, might develop matted fur, hindquarter ataxia, and its tail arched over its back. Seizures may very rarely occur. Near-death stages include the animal showing signs of drowsiness and unresponsiveness.

Early clinical signs of TME are often subtle, and can include difficulty eating and swallowing as well as changes in typical grooming behavior. Affected mink may soil their nests or scatter feces within their habitats. As the condition progresses, affected animals may become hyperexcitable and develop the tendency to bite compulsively. Other signs of the condition include incoordination, circling, jaw clenching, and self-mutilation. Once clinical signs of TME appear, the condition only progresses to fatality, with death typically occurring within 2–8 weeks.

== Diagnosis ==
Currently, no tests are available to detect signs of this illness in live animals. However, veterinary pathologists can confirm this illness by microscopic examination of the brain tissue in animals suspected to have died of this disease, where they expect to detect areas of distinct sponge-like formations, or by the identification of the prion protein in these tissue samples.

== History ==
Transmissible mink encephalopathy was first noticed in 1947 on a mink farm in the United States, in Brown County, Wisconsin, but the disease was not reported in the scientific literature until 1965. Upon reviewing prior TME outbreaks in the U.S. and Canada, in all four cases which were not linked to a commercial feed plant and in which records were available, "downer" cattle were included in the mink diet. The most recent outbreak occurred in 1985, on a farm in the town of Stetsonville, also in Wisconsin. Outbreaks of TME have also occurred in Canada, Finland, Germany, and the former Soviet Union.

== See also ==
- Creutzfeldt–Jakob disease
- Kuru
- Scrapie
