= Gerstmann–Sträussler–Scheinker syndrome =

Human neurodegenerative disease

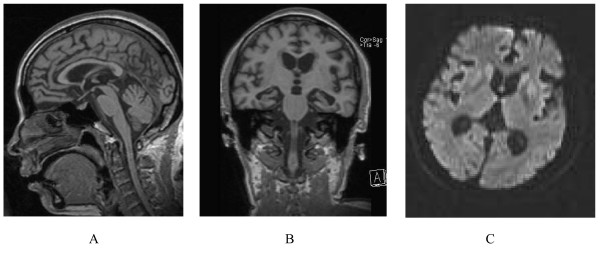
- A person with inherited prion disease has cerebellar atrophy. This is quite typical of GSS.
- Specialty: Neurology
- Symptoms: difficulty speaking, developing dementia, memory loss, vision loss, ataxia
- Complications: aspiration pneumonia, akinetic mutism
- Usual onset: 30's to 50's
- Duration: 2-10 years, usually 5-6 years, ranging from 3 months to 13 years
- Types: Typical GSS, GSS with areflexia and paresthesia, pure dementia GSS, Creutzfeldt-Jakob disease-like GSS
- Causes: Prion, specifically PrP^{GSS}
- Risk factors: PRNP mutations, usually a replacement of proline with leucine at codon 102 of PRNP (P102L)
- Diagnostic method: PRNP gene sequencing
- Differential diagnosis: Creutzfeldt-Jakob disease
- Prevention: Gene editing of children at risk
- Treatment: None
- Medication: None
- Prognosis: Universally fatal, life expectancy is typically 5-6 years from diagnosis, with a range of 3 months to 13 years
- Frequency: 1-10 of every 100 million people
- Deaths: Unknown

Gerstmann–Sträussler–Scheinker syndrome (GSS) is an extremely rare, invariably fatal neurodegenerative disease that usually affects patients from 35 to 55 years in age. It is exclusively heritable in an autosomal dominant manner, and is found in only a few families around the world. GSS is considered a transmissible spongiform encephalopathy (TSE) due to the causative role played by the PRNP gene, which encodes for the human prion protein. It was discovered by Josef Gerstmann, Ernst Sträussler, and Ilya Scheinker in 1936.

Certain symptoms are common to GSS, such as progressive ataxia, pyramidal signs, and dementia; they worsen as the disease progresses. Much like Creutzfeldt-Jakob disease, Gerstmann–Sträussler–Scheinker syndrome has significant variety in presentation.

== Symptoms and signs ==
Symptoms start with slowly developing dysarthria (difficulty speaking) and cerebellar truncal ataxia (unsteadiness) before the progressive dementia becomes more evident. In the early stages of GSS, people with the condition may also exhibit clumsiness and difficulty walking. As the condition progresses, symptoms of ataxia become more pronounced. Loss of memory can be the first symptom of GSS. Extrapyramidal and pyramidal symptoms and signs may occur, and the disease may mimic spinocerebellar ataxias in the beginning stages. Myoclonus (spasmodic muscle contraction) is less frequently seen than in Creutzfeldt–Jakob disease. Many patients also exhibit Nystagmus (involuntary movement of the eyes), visual disturbances, and blindness, or deafness. The neuropathological findings of GSS include widespread deposition of amyloid plaques composed of misfolded prion proteins.

Four clinical phenotypes are recognized: typical GSS, GSS with areflexia and paresthesia, pure dementia GSS and Creutzfeldt-Jakob disease-like GSS.

== Causes ==
GSS is part of a group of diseases called transmissible spongiform encephalopathies. These diseases are caused by prions, which are a class of pathogenic proteins that are resistant to proteases. These prions then form clusters in the brain, which are responsible for the neurodegenerative effects seen in patients.

The P102L mutation, which causes a substitution of proline to a leucine in codon 102, has been found in the prion protein gene (PRNP, on chromosome 20) of most affected individuals. Therefore, it appears this genetic change is usually required for the development of the disease.

== Diagnosis ==
GSS can be identified through genetic testing. Brain magnetic resonance imaging scans can also be used to differentiate it from other neurodegenerative diseases. Testing for GSS involves a blood and DNA examination in order to detect the mutated gene at certain codons. If the genetic mutation is present, the patient will eventually develop GSS.

== Prognosis ==
PET-CT images show the left superior parietal lobe (A) and left middle temporal lobe (B) had mild to moderate decreased glucose metabolism.

GSS is a disease that progresses slowly, lasting from roughly 2 to 10 years, with an average of approximately five years. Symptoms, such as clumsiness and unsteadiness when walking, appear at the beginning of the illness. Muscle jerking (Myoclonus) is much less common than in Creutzfeldt-Jakob disease. Speaking becomes difficult (called Dysarthria), and dementia develops. Nystagmus (rapid movement of the eyes in one direction, followed by a slower drift back to the original position) and deafness may develop. Muscle coordination is lost (called Ataxia), which may cause muscles to become stiff. Usually, the muscles that control breathing and coughing are impaired, resulting in a high risk of Aspiration pneumonia, which is the most common cause of death. The disease eventually results in Akinetic mutism (where a patient neither moves or speaks due to both Akinesia and Mutism).

The disease ultimately results in death, most commonly from the patient either going into a coma or from a secondary infection due to the patient's loss of vital bodily functions.

== Treatment ==
There is no cure for GSS, nor is there any known treatment to slow the progression of the disease. Therapies and medication are aimed at treating or slowing down the effects of the symptoms. The goal of these symptomatic treatments is to try to improve the patient's quality of life as much as possible. Despite this, there is some ongoing research to find a cure, with one of the most prominent examples being the PRN100 monoclonal antibody.

== Research ==
Prion diseases, also called transmissible spongiform encephalopathies (TSEs), are neurodegenerative diseases of the brain thought to be caused by a protein that converts to an abnormal form called a prion. GSS is a very rare TSE, making its genetic origin nearly impossible to determine. It is also challenging to find any patients with GSS, as the disease tends to be underreported due to its clinical similarity to other diseases, and has been found in only a few countries. In 1989, the first mutation of the prion protein gene was identified in a GSS family. The largest of these families affected by GSS is the Indiana Kindred, spanning over 8 generations and includes over 3,000 people, with 57 individuals known to be affected. GSS was later realized to have many different gene mutation types, varying in symptom severity, timing and progression.
