= Scrapie =

Degenerative disease that affects sheep and goats

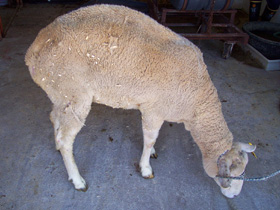
Ewe with scrapie with weight loss and hunched appearance

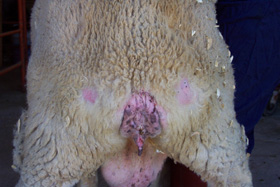
Same ewe as above with bare patches on rear end from scraping

Scrapie (/ˈskreɪpi/) is a fatal, degenerative disease affecting the nervous systems of sheep and goats. It is one of several transmissible spongiform encephalopathies (TSEs), and as such it is thought to be caused by a prion. Scrapie has been known since at least 1732 and does not appear to be transmissible to humans. However, it has been found to be experimentally transmissible to humanised transgenic mice and non-human primates.

The name scrapie is derived from one of the clinical signs of the condition, wherein affected animals will compulsively scrape off their fleeces against rocks, trees or fences. The disease apparently causes an itching sensation in the animals. Other clinical signs include excessive lip smacking, altered gaits and convulsive collapse.

Scrapie is infectious and transmissible among conspecifics, so one of the most common ways to contain it (since it is incurable) is to quarantine and kill those affected. However, scrapie tends to persist in flocks and can also arise spontaneously in flocks that have not previously had cases of the disease. The mechanism of transmission between animals and other aspects of the biology of the disease are only poorly understood, and are active areas of research. Recent studies suggest prions may be spread through urine and persist in the environment for decades.

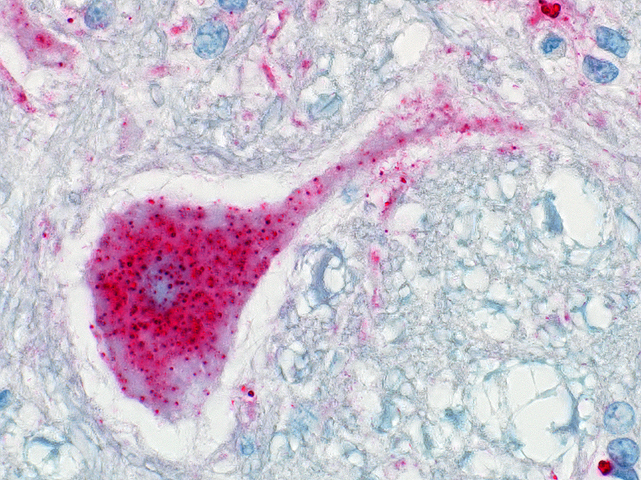
Micrograph image of a neuron within the brain of a goat with scrapie disease

Scrapie usually affects sheep around three to five years of age. The potential for transmission at birth and from contact with placental tissues is apparent.

== Regulation ==
The disease has been notifiable in the EU since 1993, but unlike bovine spongiform encephalopathy (BSE, commonly known as mad cow disease), there was no evidence as of 1999 to suggest that scrapie is a risk to human health. In July 2003, a Canadian Food Inspection Agency officer echoed that in his assessment of the danger to Canadian animals. As of 2004, the USDA made no mention of scrapie in its Sheep and Goats Death Loss circular.

Historically, scrapie was considered to be an animal health issue. However, between 1996 and 1999, the UK Spongiform Encephalopathy Advisory Committee considered the control and eradication of scrapie in the UK also with public health in mind because of concern over five issues:

- Meat and bone meal (MBM), which was suspected to be the source of the BSE in cattle outbreak in the late 1990s, had also been fed to sheep and goats.
- BSE had been transmitted to sheep following experimental oral exposure.
- Transmissible spongiform encephalopathy (TSE) infection was widespread through the carcasses of the sheep, unlike cattle infection which is limited to neural tissues.
- Scrapie in sheep was underreported and it might be masking BSE, were it present in sheep.
- Specified risk material (SRM) measures may not be adequate to control human exposure.

== Cause ==
Scrapie and other transmissible spongiform encephalopathies are caused by prions. Prions multiply by causing normally folded proteins of the same type to take on their abnormal shape, which then go on to do the same, in a kind of chain reaction. These abnormal proteins are gradually accumulated in the body, especially in nerve cells, which subsequently die.

== Transmission and pathogenesis ==
The primary mode of transmission is from mother to lamb through ingestion of placental or allantoic fluids. The agent can also enter through cuts in the skin. An experiment has shown lambs risk being infected through milk from infected ewes, but the lambs in the experiment also infected each other, making the risk of infection difficult to assess. The experiment did not continue long enough to show if the lambs developed symptoms, but merely that the abnormal prion was present in their bodies.

The pathogenesis of scrapie involves the lymphatic system. Once the agent is absorbed through the intestines, misfolded prions first appear and accumulate in the lymph nodes, especially in Peyer's patches at the small intestine. Eventually, the infection invades the brain, often through the spinal cord or the medulla oblongata by creeping up the sympathetic and parasympathetic nervous system, respectively.

== Clinical signs and diagnosis ==
Changes are mild at first; slight behavioral changes and an increase in chewing movements may occur. Ataxia and neurological signs then develop, and affected sheep struggle to keep up with the flock.

The signs and effects of scrapie typically appear 2–5 years after infection but may appear later. Once the onset of clinical signs has occurred, sheep typically live for 1–6 months. In some cases, they may live longer, but death is an inevitable consequence of the condition. Signs of scrapie vary between infected individual animals and develop slowly. Due to the nerve cell damage caused by the condition, affected animals may exhibit behavioral changes, tremor, pruritus, and locomotor incoordination.

Some sheep scratch excessively and show patches of wool loss and lesions on the skin. Scratching sheep over the rump area may lead to a nibbling reflex, which is characteristic for the condition.

Signs of a chronic systemic disease appear later, with weight loss, anorexia, lethargy, and death.

Post mortem examination is important for the diagnosis of scrapie. Histology of tissues shows accumulation of prions in the central nervous system, and immunohistochemical staining and ELISA can also be used to demonstrate the protein.

== Treatment and preventive action ==
No treatment is available for affected sheep.

A test performed by sampling a small amount of lymphatic tissue from the third eyelid is now available.

In the UK in 2001, the Blair ministry implemented a National Scrapie Plan, which encouraged breeding from sheep that are genetically more resistant to scrapie. This is intended to eventually reduce the incidence of the disease in the UK sheep population. Scrapie occurs in Europe and North America, but to date, Australia and New Zealand (both major sheep-producing countries) are scrapie-free. In 2003, there was pressure from affected Canadian husbandry practitioners on the Chretien government and their CFIA to implement their own national scrapie plan.

Breeds such as Cheviot and Suffolk are more susceptible to scrapie than other breeds. Specifically, this is determined by the genes coding for the naturally occurring prion proteins. The most resistant sheep have a double set of ARR alleles, while sheep with the VRQ allele are the most susceptible. Alleles are named by the single-letter amino acid abbreviation of the positions 136, 154, 171 of the sheep prion protein. A simple blood test reveals the allele of the sheep, and many countries are actively breeding away the VRQ allele. Double ARR does not produce full protection, but does provide significant resistance and slowdown.

Out of fear of BSE-like transmission, many European countries banned some traditional sheep or goat products made without removing the spinal cord, such as smalahove and smokie.

In 2010, a team from New York described detection of PrP^{Sc} even when initially present at only one part in a hundred billion (10^{−11}) in brain tissue. The method combines amplification with a novel technology called surround optical fiber immunoassay and some specific antibodies against PrP^{Sc}. The technique allowed detection of PrP^{Sc} after many fewer cycles of conversion than others have achieved, substantially reducing the possibility of artefacts, as well as speeding up the assay. The researchers also tested their method on blood samples from apparently healthy sheep that went on to develop scrapie. The animals' brains were analysed once any symptoms became apparent. They could therefore compare results from brain tissue and blood taken once the animals exhibited symptoms of the diseases, with blood obtained earlier in the animals' lives, and from uninfected animals. The results showed very clearly that PrP^{Sc} could be detected in the blood of animals long before the symptoms appeared. After further development and testing, this method could be of great value in surveillance as a blood- or urine-based screening test for scrapie.

In the United Kingdom, if a sheep is suspected or found to have scrapie in laboratory tests, it will be euthanised to prevent further suffering and to reduce the possibility of transmission. The Animal and Plant Health Agency will compensate farmers £30 for a cull animal and £90 for any others confirmed to have scrapie, and if scrapie is not confirmed, farmers can claim the "market value" of the sheep, up to £400 in compensation.

== Transmission/exposure pathways ==
Various studies have indicated prions (PrP^{SC}) which infect sheep and goats with the fatal transmissible encephalopathy known as scrapie are able to persist in soil for years without losing their pathogenic activity. Dissemination of prions into the environment can occur from several sources: mainly, infectious placenta or amniotic fluid of sheep and possibly environmental contamination by saliva or excrement.

Confirmatory testing for scrapie can only be achieved by applying immunohistochemistry of disease-associated prion protein (PrP^{SC}) to tissues collected post mortem, including obex (a brainstem structure), retropharyngeal lymph node and palatine tonsil. A live animal diagnostic, not confirmatory, test was approved in 2008 for immunochemistry testing on rectal biopsy-derived lymphoid tissue by USDA.

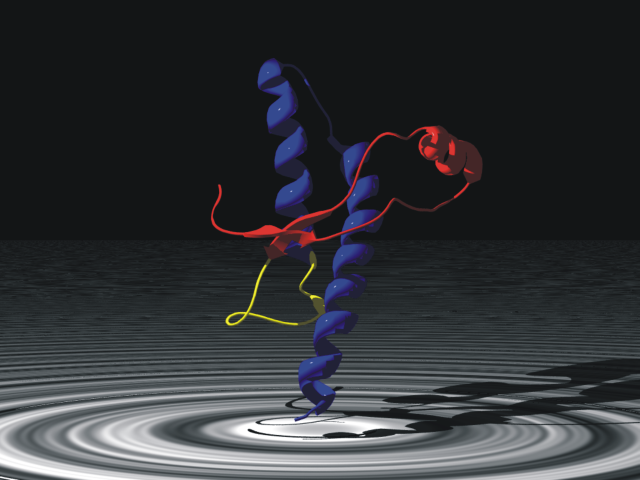
Human prion protein, residues 125–228, created from protein database (PDB) entry 1QM3. The coloring illustrates the subdomains, that are proposed to initiate the conversion from the normal cellular to the scrapie form by slow motions.

Natural transmission of scrapie in the field seems to occur via the alimentary tract in the majority of cases, and scrapie-free sheep flocks can become infected on pastures where outbreaks of scrapie had been observed before. These findings point to a sustained contagion in the environment, notably in the soil.

Prion concentration in birth fluids does not alter the infectivity of the prions. Naturally or experimentally infected does and ewes transmit the infection to the lambs, even when placentas have little PrP^{SC}. PrP^{SC} is shed at a higher percentage in sheep placentas (52–72%) than in goat placenta (5–10%) in study trials at the USDA Agricultural Research Service.

Detectable PrP^{SC} has been reported in the feces of sheep both in the terminal and the early preclinical stages of the disease, suggesting the prions are likely to be shed into the environment throughout the course of the disease. Several sources of prions in feces could be postulated, including environmental ingestion and swallowing infected saliva; however, the most likely source is shedding from the gut-associated lymphoid tissue. Ruminant animals have specialized Peyer's patches that, throughout the length of the ileum, amount to about 100,000 follicles, and all of these could be infected and shedding prions into the lumen. Scrapie prions have been found in the Peyer's patches of naturally infected asymptomatic lambs as young as four months of age.

=== Exposure through contaminated vaccines ===
- Contaminated Louping-ill vaccine, known as the 1935 Moredun Louping-ill Vaccine Disaster. More than 1,500 sheep developed scrapie following vaccination. The vaccine was made using formalin-treated sheep brain tissue unknowingly contaminated with scrapie agent. Subsequent investigations showed that intracerebral inoculation of brain and spinal cord tissue from scrapie-infected sheep led to scrapie development in 60% of inoculated sheep, suggesting the presence of a filtrable virus as the probable infective agent.
- Contaminated Mycoplasma agalactiae vaccine. Sudden outbreaks in Italy in 1997 and 1998 were attributed to the administration of a contaminated vaccine, as the brain lesions and polymorphism in the affected animals were similar to those exposed to the same vaccine but different from those in unvaccinated sheep with scrapie. Molecular typing revealed the presence of two prion strains in vaccinated animals, suggesting accidental intra- and interspecies transmission due to the vaccine.

=== Exposure through contaminated soil ===
Ingestion of soil by grazing sheep has been measured in two soil types, at two stocking rates, and over two grazing seasons. Animals ingested up to 400 g soil per kg of body weight between May and November. Rainfall and stocking rate emerged as factors influencing ingestion. The effect of soil type and vegetation type was less evident.

The average weight of an adult sheep is around 250 pounds. If an adult sheep ate 400 g/kg of soil as predicted by D. McGrath et al., then the average sheep would ingest about 45,000 g over six months, or 251 g per day. Assuming the soil was contaminated with prions (PrP^{SC}) from feces or birth fluids, then potentially the sheep would become infected. The concentration of the prions in the soil is uncertain, and concentration is not directly proportional to infectivity. Factors affecting prion infectivity in the soil have been shown to include the length of time in the soil and the binding abilities of the soil.

For a detailed risk assessment of scrapie-contaminated soil, it was of major importance to analyze whether the detectable PrP^{Sc} in the soil extracts still exhibited oral infectivity after incubation times up to 29 months. A bioassay with Syrian hamsters was performed by feeding the animals with contaminated soil or aqueous soil extracts that had been collected after soil incubation for 26 and 29 months, respectively. Hamsters fed with contaminated soil exhibited their first scrapie-associated symptoms at two weeks to six months (95% CI) after the first feeding. The hamsters reached the terminal stage of scrapie at five to 21 months (95% CI) after the first feeding. This indicated substantial amounts of persistent infectivity in soil that had been incubated for 26 and 29 months. In Iceland in 1978, a program was implemented to eradicate scrapie, and affected flocks were culled, premises were disinfected, and sheep houses were burnt; after two to three years, the premises were restocked with lambs from scrapie-free areas. Between 1978 and 2004, scrapie recurred on 33 farms. Nine recurrences occurred 14–21 years after culling as a result of persistent environmental contamination with PrP^{Sc}.

The binding abilities of different soil types have been shown to enhance disease penetrance into a population. Soil containing the common clay mineral montmorillonite (Mte) and kaolinite (Kte) binds more effectively with the prions than soil containing quartz. Enhanced transmissibility of soil-bound prions may explain the environmental spread of scrapie despite low levels shed into the environment. The mechanism by which Mte or other soil components enhances the transmissibility of particle-bound prions remains to be clarified. Prion binding to Mte or other soil components may partially protect PrP^{SC} from denaturation or proteolysis in the digestive tract, allowing more disease agents to be taken up from the gut. Adsorption of PrP^{Sc} soil may alter the aggregation state of the protein, shifting the size distribution toward more infectious prion protein particles, thereby increasing the infectious units. For prion disease to be transmitted via ingestion of prion-contaminated soil, prions must also remain infectious by the oral route of exposure. Researchers at the University of Wisconsin investigated the oral infectivity of Mte-bound and soil-bound prions. The effects of prion source (via infected brain homogenate and purified PrP^{Sc}) and dose on penetrance (proportion of animals eventually exhibiting clinical signs of scrapie) and incubation period (time to onset of clinical symptoms) were evaluated. About 38% of animals receiving orally 200 ng of unbound, clarified PrP^{Sc} derived from soil exhibited clinical symptoms, with an incubation period for infected animals of 203 to 633 days. All animals orally dosed with an equivalent amount of Mte-bound PrP^{Sc} manifested disease symptoms in 195 to 637 days. By contrast, animals orally receiving Mte soil alone or one-tenth as much unbound clarified PrP^{Sc} (20 ng) remained asymptomatic throughout the course of the experiment. These data established that Mte-bound prions remain infectious via the oral route of exposure, and that the binding agent Mte increases disease penetrance, enhancing the efficiency of oral transmission.

=== Exposure through contaminated hay mites ===
"With scrapie, the archetypical TSE, which is a natural disease in sheep and goats, the disease can appear suddenly in a flock in the absence of any known exposure to infected flocks (Palsson, 1979). Finally, fields in Iceland, that were left empty for up to 3 years after the destruction of scrapie-infected flocks, were repopulated with known scrapie-free sheep, and some of the sheep in this latter group subsequently developed scrapie (Palsson, 1979). This last 'experiment in nature' has yielded similar results a number of times in Iceland and the United Kingdom. In one Icelandic farm, flocks have been eradicated three times; each time, the farm was left without sheep for 2 years, and after restocking with sheep from scrapie-free areas, the disease reappeared. Several years ago, a suggestion was made (S Sigurdarson, personal communication) that hay mites would be a good candidate as a vector for scrapie; this led to the infection of mice with mite samples prepared from hay obtained from five Icelandic farms. Ten of these 71 mice became sick after injection with mite preparations from three of the five farms (Wisniewski et al, 1996; Rubenstein et al, 1998). The incubation periods ranged from 340 days to 626 days, and these mice had the protease-resistant form Prp^{Sc}, of a host-coded glycoprotein, PrP^{c}. The protease-resistant form is a marker of TSE disease (Prusiner, 1991; Parchi et al, 1996). For some of these clinically positive mice, the banding pattern on WB analysis was unique (Wisniewski et al, 1996; Rubenstein et al, 1998)."

=== Transmission summary ===
Prions (PrP^{Sc}) are shed from sheep and goats in birth fluids, feces, and other excrement. The concentration of the prions is uncertain, but is not directly proportional to infectivity. Sheep ingest a considerable amount of soil, so soil represents a plausible environmental reservoir of scrapie prions, which can persist in the environment for years. Longevity of the prions and the attachment of soil particles likely influences the persistence and infectivity of prions in the environment.

Effective methods of inactivating prions in the soil are currently lacking, and the effects of natural degradation mechanisms on prion infectivity are largely unknown. An improved understanding of the processes affecting the mobility, persistence and bioavailability of prions in soil is needed for the management of prion-contaminated environments. A system for estimating the prion-binding capacity of soil on farms using simple soil analysis may allow an estimate of the prion risk in the environment, and whether altering prion binding by the use of soil amendments may help to mitigate the infectious prions. Lichens, specifically, Parmelia sulcata, Cladonia rangiferina and Lobaria pulmonaria, may have potential for reducing the number of prions because some lichen species contain proteases that show promise in breaking down the prion. Further work to clone and characterize the proteases, assess their effects on prion infectivity, and determine which component organism or organisms present in lichens produce or influence the protease activity is warranted and is currently under investigation.

== Genetics ==
The prion gene that codes for the prion protein is highly conserved in most mammals, meaning the gene is similar and present in most species of mammals. Three locations on the prion protein gene have been identified as highly polymorphic and may have an effect on scrapie: codons 136, 154, and 171. Codon 154 has not shown any evidence of having a high effect on scrapie susceptibility, but is most likely having an effect on incubation time of the disease. Codons 136 and 171 are thought to control the incubation time as well as the susceptibility of the disease, and are the ones the USDA uses in its breeding standard. Codon 171 has been determined to be the major genetic factor in scrapie susceptibility.

== See also ==
- Creutzfeldt–Jakob disease
- Kuru
- Transmissible mink encephalopathy
- Virino
- Rams (film), a 2015 Icelandic drama
