= Daniel Carleton Gajdusek =

American medical researcher (1923–2008)

- Born: September 9, 1923; Yonkers, New York, U.S.
- Died: December 12, 2008 (aged 85); Tromsø, Norway
- Education: University of Rochester; Harvard Medical School
- Known for: Early discovery of prion disease
- Awards: E. Mead Johnson Award (1963); Nobel Prize in Physiology or Medicine (1976)
- Scientific career
- Fields: Medicine

Daniel Carleton Gajdusek (/ˈɡaɪdəʃɛk/ GHY-də-shek; September 9, 1923 – December 12, 2008) was an American physician, medical researcher, and convicted child sex offender, who was the co-recipient (with Baruch S. Blumberg) of the Nobel Prize in Physiology or Medicine in 1976 for work on the transmissibility of kuru, implying the existence of an infectious agent, which he named an 'unconventional virus'.

In 1996, Gajdusek was charged with child molestation, and spent 12 months in prison after being convicted. He subsequently entered a self-imposed exile in Europe, where he died a decade later. Despite openly admitting to molesting boys and his approval of incest, Gajdusek still received support from many peers who advocated clemency and felt his crimes were lessened by his scientific contributions.

His papers are held at the National Library of Medicine in Bethesda, Maryland, and at the American Philosophical Society in Philadelphia, Pennsylvania.

== Early life and education ==
Gajdusek's father, Karol Gajdusek, was a Slovak from Smrdáky, Slovakia. His mother Ottilia Dobróczki emigrated from Debrecen, today Hungary. Gajdusek was born in Yonkers, New York, and graduated in 1943 from the University of Rochester, where he studied physics, biology, chemistry, and mathematics.

He obtained an M.D. from Harvard University in 1946 and performed postdoctoral research at Columbia University, the California Institute of Technology, and Harvard. In 1951, Gajdusek was drafted into the U.S. Army and assigned as a research virologist at the Walter Reed Army Medical Service Graduate School. He was discharged from the military in 1954.

== Career ==
In 1954, he worked as a visiting investigator at the Walter and Eliza Hall Institute of Medical Research in Melbourne, Australia. There, he began the work that culminated in the Nobel Prize. From 1970 to 1996, Gajdusek was the chief of the Laboratory of Central Nervous System Studies at NINDS at the National Institutes of Health (NIH). He was elected as a member of the American Philosophical Society in 1978.

=== Kuru research ===
Gajdusek's best-known work focused on kuru. This disease was rampant among the South Fore people of New Guinea in the 1950s and 1960s. He received the 1976 Nobel Prize in Physiology or Medicine for demonstrating, alongside Michael Alpers and Clarence Gibbs Jr, that kuru was a transmittable disease.

Gajdusek was introduced to the problem of kuru by Vincent Zigas, a district medical officer in the Fore Tribe region of New Guinea. Gajdusek provided the first medical description of this unique neurological disorder, which was miscast in the popular press as the "laughing sickness" because some patients displayed risus sardonicus as a symptom. Gajdusek began investigating the disease in 1957 but could find no likely cause for the epidemic; no conventional infectious agent, no nutritional deficiency, no toxin, as both men wrote in their 1977 paper.

He is often incorrectly credited for establishing the direct link between cannibalism and kuru disease. In reality, the first investigators to propose the hypothesis were married couple Shirley Lindenbaum and Robert Glasse. In 1968, Shirley Lindenbaum and Robert Glasse, together with John D. Mathews, an epidemiologist based at Okapa, published an article in the Lancet that consolidated all the anthropological and epidemiological evidence, demonstrating definitively that cannibalism was responsible for the spread of kuru among the Fore.

Gajdusek was initially dismissive of anthropological evidence gathered by Shirley Lindenbaum and Robert Glasse in 1963 that suggested not only that kuru was transmissible, but that cannibalism was the likely mode of transmission. Lindenbaum and Glasse felt further evidence was required to support this theory and discussed it with Alpers who relayed the theory to Gajdusek. It was with Alpers' encouragement that the experiment involving the inoculation of affected brain tissue into chimpanzees was conducted and then established in 1965 the transmissibility of the disease. This was done by drilling holes into chimps' heads and placing pureed brain matter into the cerebellum. These animals then developed symptoms of kuru.

In the 2000s, Gajdusek was asked when the hypothesis of cannibalism as a vehicle to spread kuru was first envisaged. His response, "even completely drunk would come to the conclusion that a disease endemic among cannibals must be spread through eating corpses". Contradictingly, during his Nobel Prize lecture he stated that kuru was a "slow virus" spread by "conjunctival, nasal, and skin contamination with highly infectious brain tissue"

Kuru was shown to have remarkable similarity to scrapie, a disease of sheep and goats caused by an unconventional infectious agent. Subsequently, additional human agents belonging to the same group were discovered. They include sporadic, familial, and variant Creutzfeldt–Jakob disease. Gajdusek recognized that diseases like kuru and Creutzfeldt–Jakob disease were caused by a new infectious agent that had not yet been identified. Further research on the scrapie agent by Stanley Prusiner and others led to the identification of endogenous proteins called prions as the cause of these diseases.

=== "Unconventional viruses" ===
In his 1977 paper "Unconventional Viruses and the Origin and Disappearance of Kuru", Gajdusek postulated that the cause of kuru, scrapie and Creutzfeldt–Jakob disease were caused by what he termed an "unconventional virus". In comparison to normal viruses, unconventional viruses had a long incubation period and did not cause an immune response in the host. Although Gajdusek said there were no demonstrable nucleic acids in unconventional viruses, he did not rule out the possibility that unconventional viruses contained RNA at a low level, despite their radiation resistance.

These infectious agents were later discovered to be misfolded proteins, or prions.

== Child molestation and convictions ==
In the course of his research trips in the South Pacific, Gajdusek had brought 56 mostly male children back to live with him in the United States and provided them with the opportunity to receive high school and college education. One of these boys, now a grown man, later accused Gajdusek of molesting him as a child.

Gajdusek was charged with child molestation in April 1996, based on incriminating entries in published journals, his personal diary, and statements from a victim. In journals published and distributed by the NIH, Gajdusek wrote about men's sexual assault of boys in New Guinea, Micronesia, and other Polynesian islands, and about sexually assaulting boys during his research trips.

Gajdusek pleaded guilty in 1997 and, under a plea bargain, was sentenced to 12 months in prison. After his release in 1998, he was permitted to serve his five-year unsupervised probation in Europe. He never returned to the United States and lived in Amsterdam, spending winters in Tromsø, Norway, where the polar night around the winter solstice helped him to do more work.

Gajdusek's treatment was denounced in October 1996 as anti-elitist and unduly harsh by controversial former Edinburgh University psychologist Chris Brand.

The documentary The Genius and the Boys by Bosse Lindquist, first shown on BBC Four on June 1, 2009, notes that "seven men testified in confidentiality about Gajdusek [raping] them when they were boys", that four said "the sex was untroubling", while for three of them "the sex was a shaming, abusive, and a violation". One of these boys, the son of a friend and now an adult, appears in the film. Furthermore, Gajdusek openly admits to molesting boys and his approval of incest. The film tries to analyse Gajdusek's sexual behaviour, and also to understand his motivations for science, exploration, and life.

== Death and legacy ==
Gajdusek died December 12, 2008, in Tromsø, Norway, at the age of 85. He was working and visiting colleagues in Tromsø at the time of his death.

Hanya Yanagihara's 2013 novel, The People in the Trees, is based on Gajdusek's life, research, and child molestation conviction. The novel centers on a character named A. Norton Perina, inspired by Gajdusek, who researches the life-extending properties of sacred turtle meat in Micronesia.

In 2026 journalist Rachel Aviv wrote an article for The New Yorker on Gajdusek's life and crimes, including an interview with one of the boys he worked with, Luwi Ikabala.

== Works ==
=== Books ===
- Acute Infectious Hemorrhagic Fevers and Mycotoxicosis in the Union of Soviet Socialist Republics (1953), Washington, DC: Walter Reed Army Medical Center.

=== Articles and monographs ===
Daniel C. Gajdusek was a prolific science author come diarist, and published over 1,000 original papers, reviews and commentaries in scientific and medical journals. This is an incomplete list of some of the more cited ones.

- Gajdusek, Daniel Carleton. Unconventional viruses and the origin and disappearance of kuru. National Institutes of Health, 1977.
- Gajdusek; Carleton, Daniel; Gibbs, Clarence J.; Alpers, Mâ (1966). "Experimental transmission of a Kuru-like syndrome to chimpanzees". Nature. 209 (5025): 794–796. Bibcode:1966Natur.209..794G. doi:10.1038/209794a0. PMID 5922150. S2CID 39242676.
- Gajdusek, Daniel Carleton (1957). "Degenerative disease of the central nervous system in New Guinea: the endemic occurrence of "kuru" in the native population". New England Journal of Medicine. 257 (20): 974–978. doi:10.1056/nejm195711142572005. PMID 13483871.
- Gajdusek, Daniel Carleton (1985). "Hypothesis: interference with axonal transport of neurofilament as a common pathogenetic mechanism in certain diseases of the central nervous system". The New England Journal of Medicine. 312 (11): 714–719. doi:10.1056/nejm198503143121110. PMID 2579335.
- Gibbs, Clarence J.; Carleton Gajdusek, Daniel (1969). "Infection as the etiology of spongiform encephalopathy (Creutzfeldt–Jakob disease)". Science. 165 (3897): 1023–1025. Bibcode:1969Sci...165.1023G. doi:10.1126/science.165.3897.1023. PMID 5804726. S2CID 206567023.

== See also ==
- List of people from Yonkers, New York
