= List of people from Yonkers, New York =

This is a list of notable people who were born in or have been residents of Yonkers, a city in Westchester County, in the U.S. state of New York, in the United States.

== Academia ==
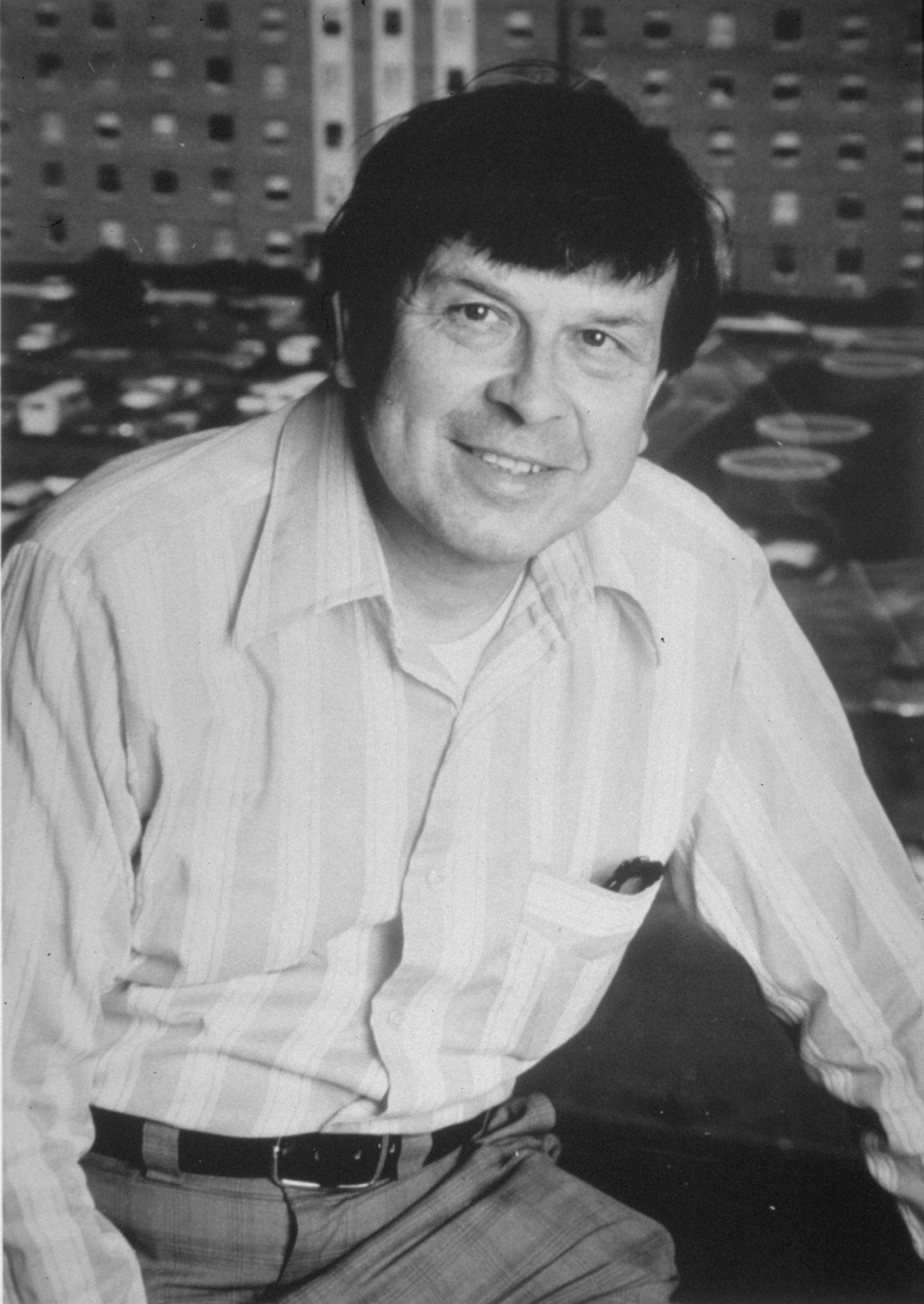
Daniel Carleton Gajdusek

- Edwin Howard Armstrong (1890–1954), electronics pioneer
- Herbert Benson (1935–2022), physician
- Ladislaus Bolchazy (1937–2012), Classical scholar, independent academic publisher, and Slovak cultural advocate
- Daniel Carleton Gajdusek (1923–2008), physician and medical researcher; co-recipient of 1976 Nobel Prize in Physiology or Medicine
- John Howard Northrop (1891–1987), co-recipient of 1946 Nobel Prize in Chemistry
- Rudolph Schoenheimer (1898–1941), German-American biochemist

== Business ==
- Elisha Otis, inventor of the safety elevator and Otis Elevator Company
- Alexander Smith, founder of Alexander Smith & Sons Carpet Company
- Jay S. Walker founder of Priceline.com

== Entertainment ==
=== Acting and directing ===
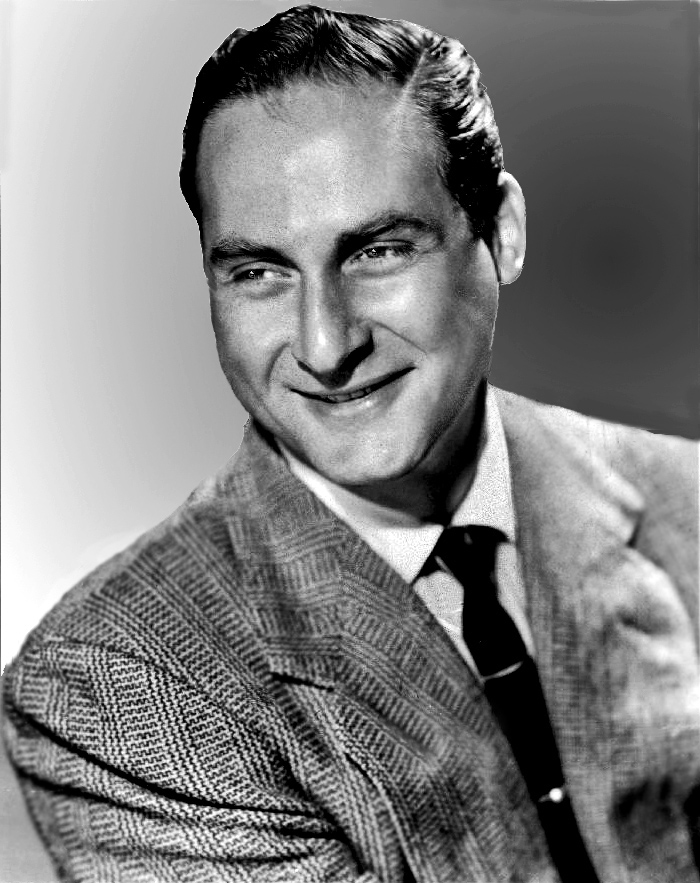
Sid Caesar

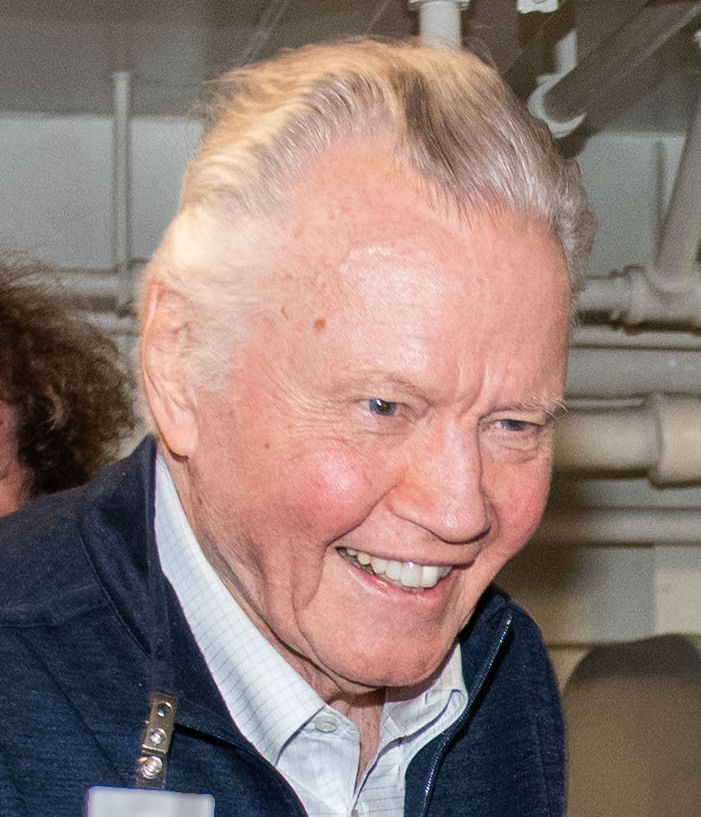
Jon Voight

- Carlos Alazraqui (born 1962), actor, stand-up comedian, and impressionist
- Stephen Book (born 1945), director, actor, and acting teacher
- Sid Caesar (1922–2014) , comic actor and comedian
- Cathy DeBuono, actress, psychotherapist, radio personality
- Thomas Mikal Ford (1964–2016), actor
- Frances Foster, actress
- Michael Fox (1921–1996), character actor who played Saul Feinberg on the daytime soap opera The Bold and the Beautiful
- Joe Howard, actor
- Clayton LeBouef (born 1954), actor
- Linda Lovelace (1949–2002), star of 1972 "porno chic" film Deep Throat
- Richard Masur (born 1948), actor
- Cathy Moriarty (born 1960), actress who appeared in Raging Bull
- Erik Palladino, actor
- Adam Rodriguez, actor
- Robert Shayne, actor
- Jon Voight (born 1938), Oscar-winning actor
- Tyler James Williams (born 1992), actor and rapper

=== Music ===
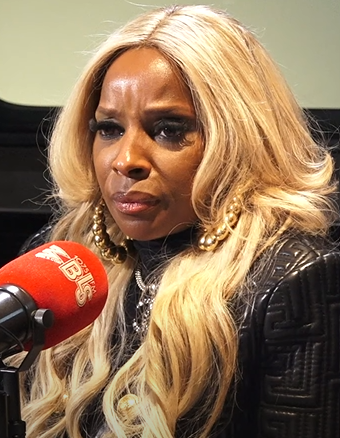
Mary J. Blige

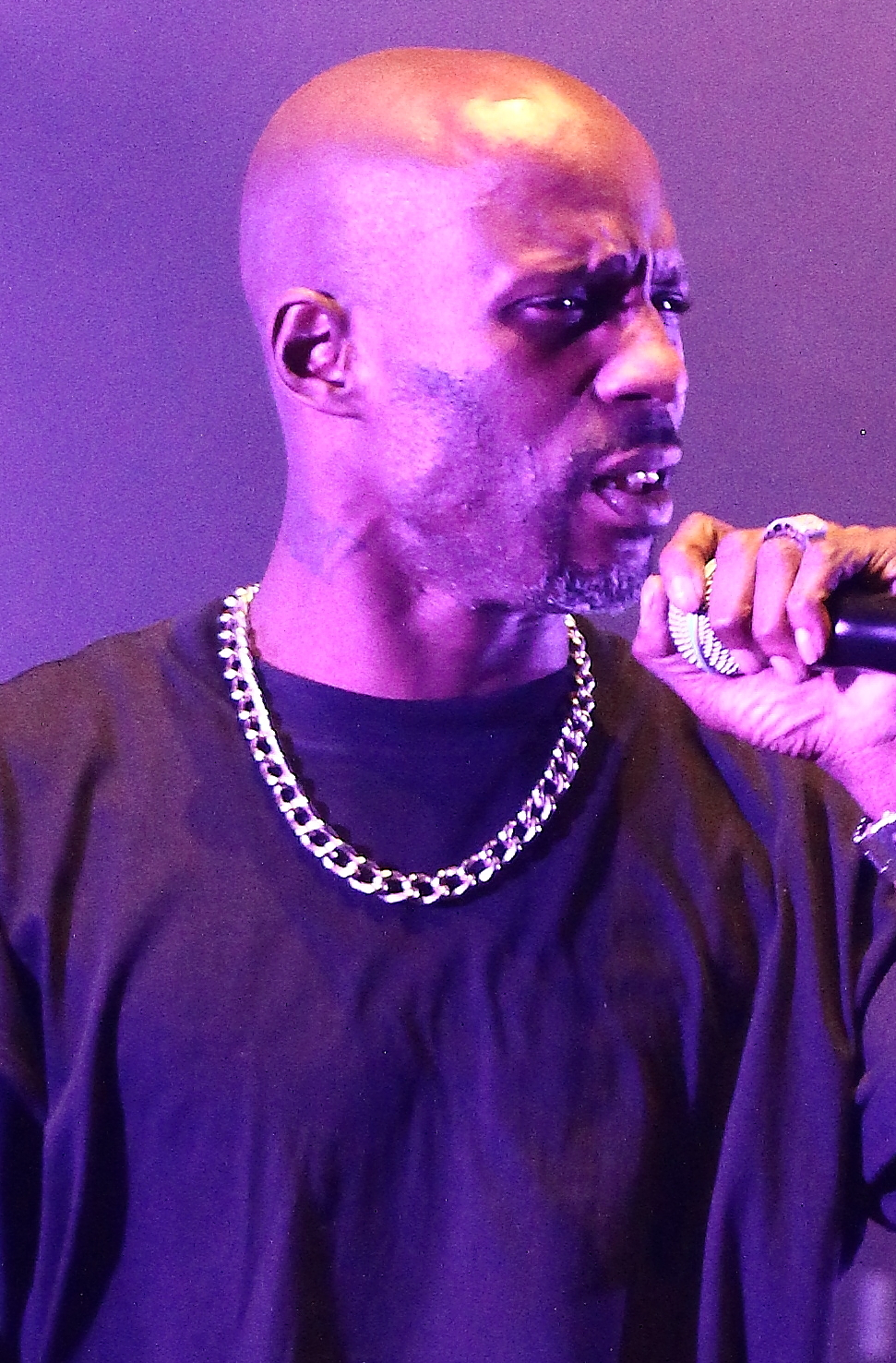
DMX

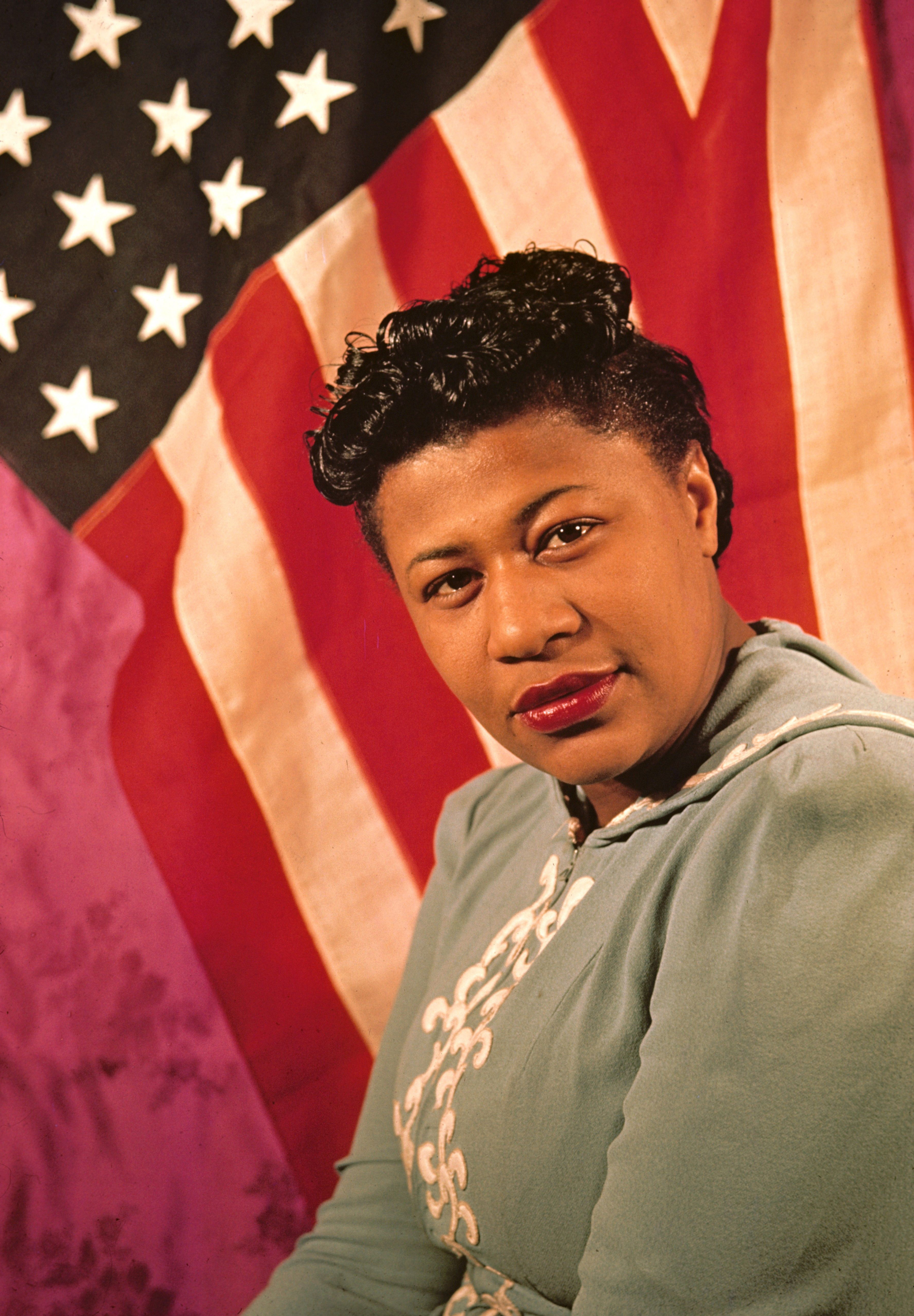
Ella Fitzgerald

- Melinda Ademi (born 1995), also known mononymously as Melinda, Kosovar-American rapper and singer
- Amanda Ayala, singer and musician
- Joseph Alfidi (1949–2015), classical pianist
- Charlie Benante (born 1962), musician best known as the drummer for thrash metal band Anthrax, as well as crossover thrashband Stormtroopers of Death.
- Mary J. Blige (born 1971), R&B singer and Academy Award-nominated actress
- Gerald Cohen (born 1960), composer and cantor
- Christine D'Clario (born 1982), Christian singer
- DMX (born Earl Simmons; 1970–2021), rapper, songwriter, actor
- Ella Fitzgerald (1917–1996), singer
- Saul Goodman (1907–1996), the principal timpanist of the New York Philharmonic from 1926 to 1972
- W. C. Handy (1873–1958), composer and musician
- Immolation, Death metal band
- Jadakiss (born 1975), rapper, member of The LOX
- Jaz-O (born 1964), rapper and record producer
- Ekrem Jevrić (1961–2016), Montenegrin singer, rapper
- Gene Krupa (1909–1973), drummer
- Stagga Lee (born 1977), rapper and DJ
- Sheek Louch (born 1976), rapper, member of The LOX
- DD Osama (born 2006), rapper
- Notti Osama (2008–2022), child rapper
- Outasight (born 1983), singer, rapper
- Kevin Puts, Pulitzer Prize-winning composer
- Will Rahmer, musician
- Allen Ritter, record producer and songwriter
- Ice Spice (born 2000), rapper
- Avery Storm (born 1976), R&B singer
- Styles P (born 1974), rapper, member of The LOX
- Chip Taylor, songwriter (brother of Jon Voight)
- Steven Tyler (born 1948), singer-songwriter, member of Aerosmith
- Hanifah Walidah, poet, rapper, singer, actor, playwright, educator, and LGBT activist
- Tyler James Williams (born 1992), actor and rapper
- Tom Wolk (1951– 2010), Hall & Oates session musician
- Lil Zane (born 1982), rapper

=== Other ===
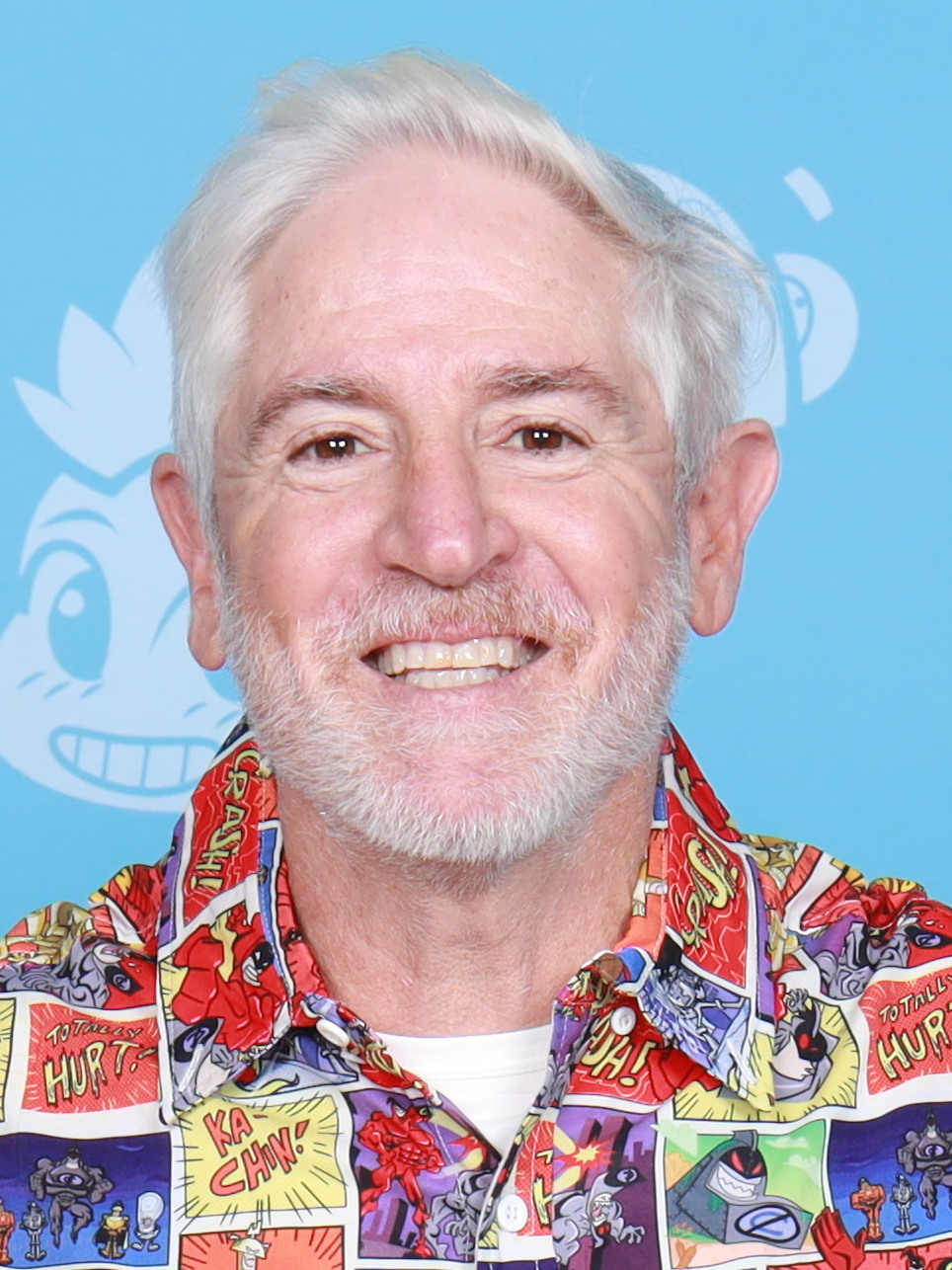
Carlos Alazraqui

- Carlos Alazraqui (born 1962), actor, stand-up comedian and impressionist
- Sid Caesar, actor and comedian
- Cathy DeBuono, actress, psychotherapist, radio personality
- John Howard Lawson (1894–1977), playwright, screenwriter, arts critic, and cultural historian
- André Nemec (born 1972), screenwriter and producer of television and film
- Mikey Reid (born1992), actor and comedian
- Paul Teutul, Sr., founder of Orange County Choppers and reality television personality on American Chopper
- Bill Tytla, animator

== Military ==
- Vincent W. Lanna, U.S. Army major general
- Joseph Stilwell, U.S. Army General during World War I and World War II

== Miscellaneous ==
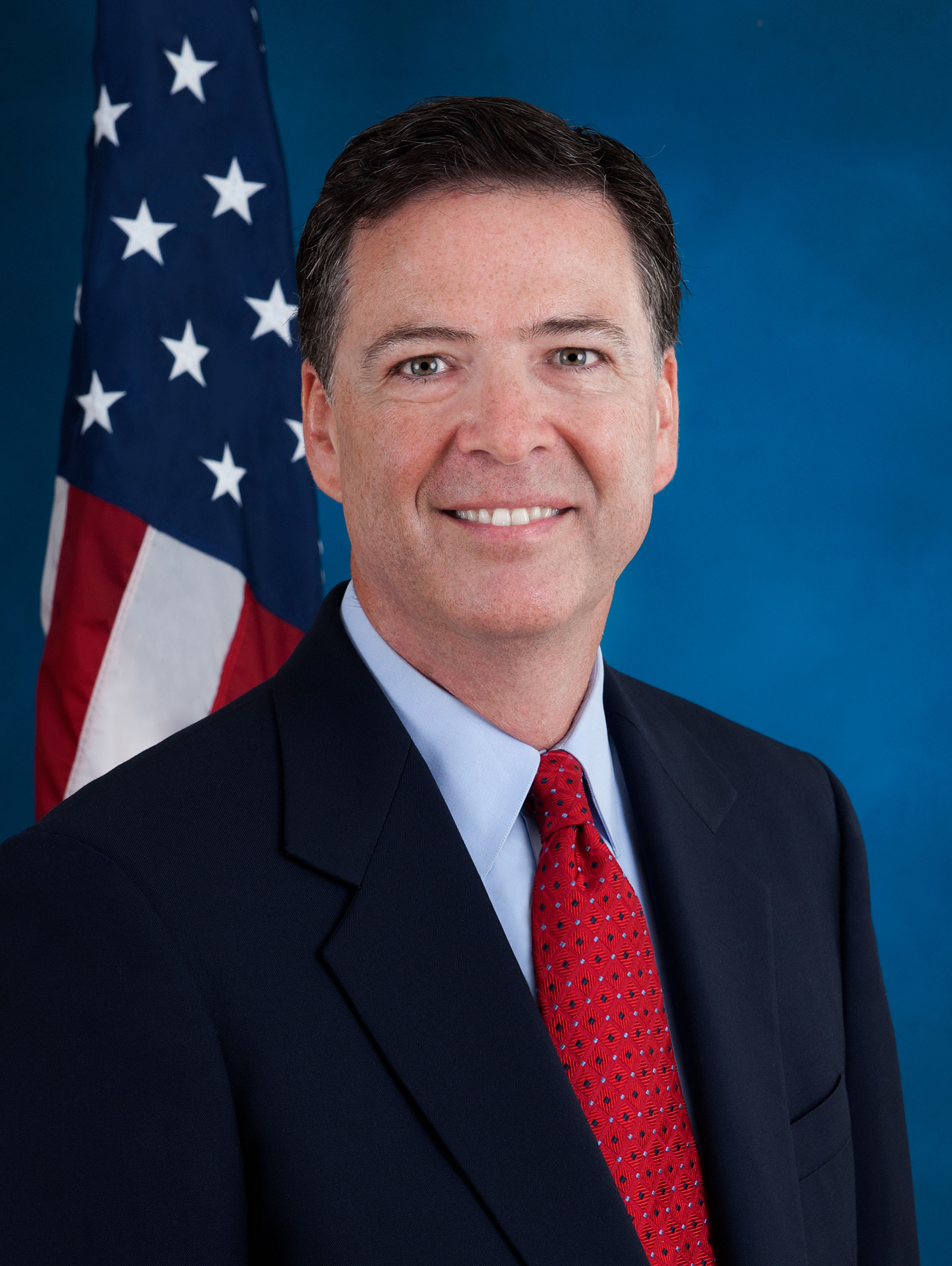
James Comey

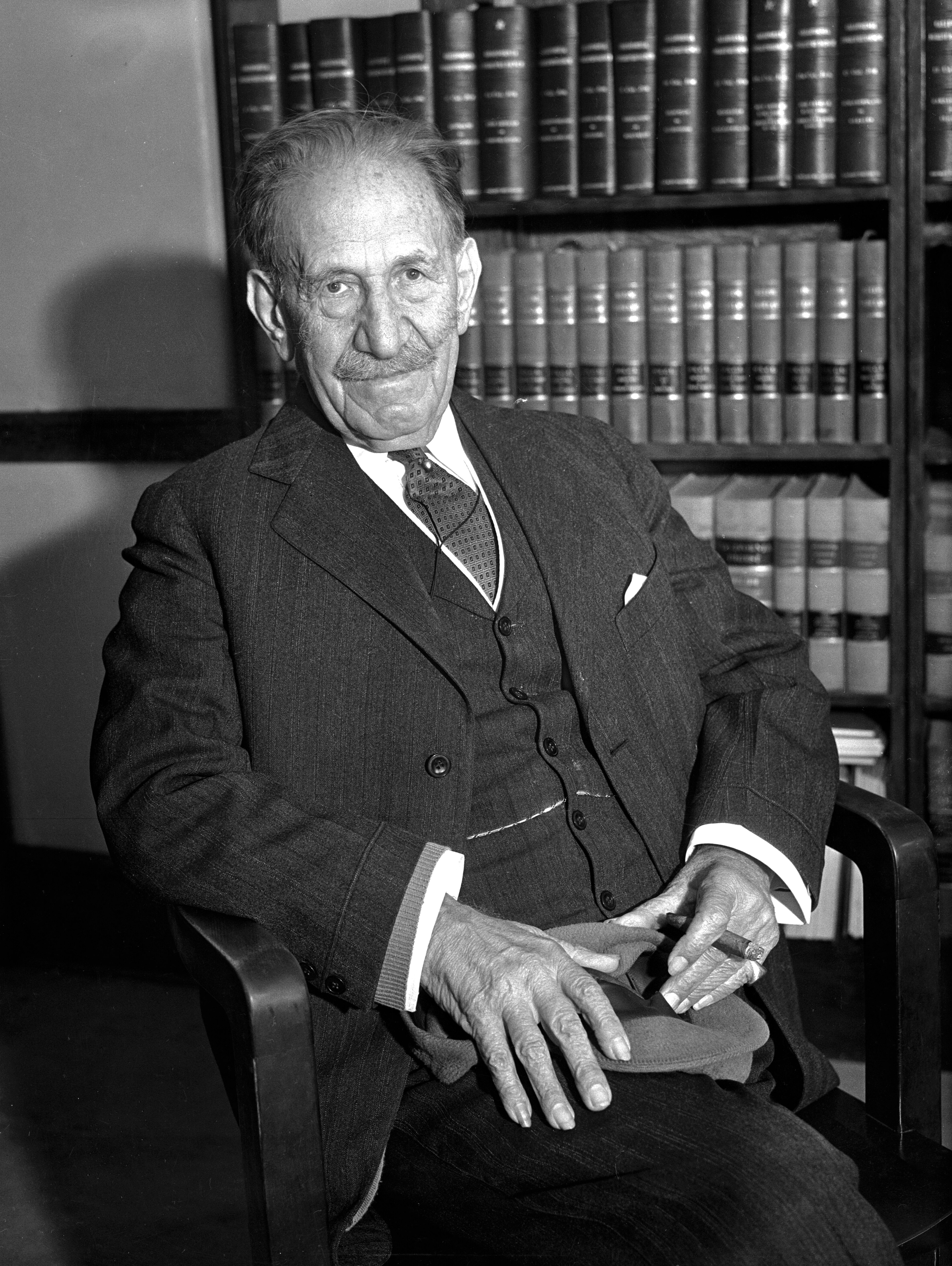
Samuel Untermyer

- David Berkowitz (born 1953), serial killer known as the Son of Sam
- Leo Baekeland (1863–1944), chemist, invented Bakelite at his "Snug Rock" home and laboratory in Yonkers in 1907
- Felix Alderisio (1912–1971), mobster, bagman, hitman and burglar (Chicago Outfit)
- James Comey, director of the FBI
- Joan Donoghue (born 1956), lawyer, President of the International Court of Justice
- Rudolf Eickemeyer, Jr., photographer
- Ron Garan, astronaut
- Lewis Hine, photographer
- Ethel D. Jacobs, thoroughbred racehorse owner
- Henrietta Wells Livermore (1864–1933), women's suffragist leader
- Michaela Odone (c. 1930–1992, née Murphy), mother of Lorenzo Odone, for whom Lorenzo's oil is named.
- Larry Ray (born 1959), criminal convicted of sex trafficking, extortion, forced labor, and other offenses, sentenced to 60 years in prison
- Sally Regenhard, community activist
- Joe Ruback, license plate guy
- Barbara Segal, artist and stone carver
- Betty Shabazz, widow of civil rights leader Malcolm X
- Bernadette Thompson, celebrity manicurist and nail artist
- Joel Steinberg (born 1941), attorney convicted of manslaughter
- Adriaen Cornelissen van der Donck, (c. 1618, 1655)
- Samuel Untermyer, Prominent lawyer and civic leader known for bequeathing his Yonkers, New York estate, now known as Untermyer Park and Gardens, to the people of Yonkers
- Melanie White, jewelry designer

== Politics ==
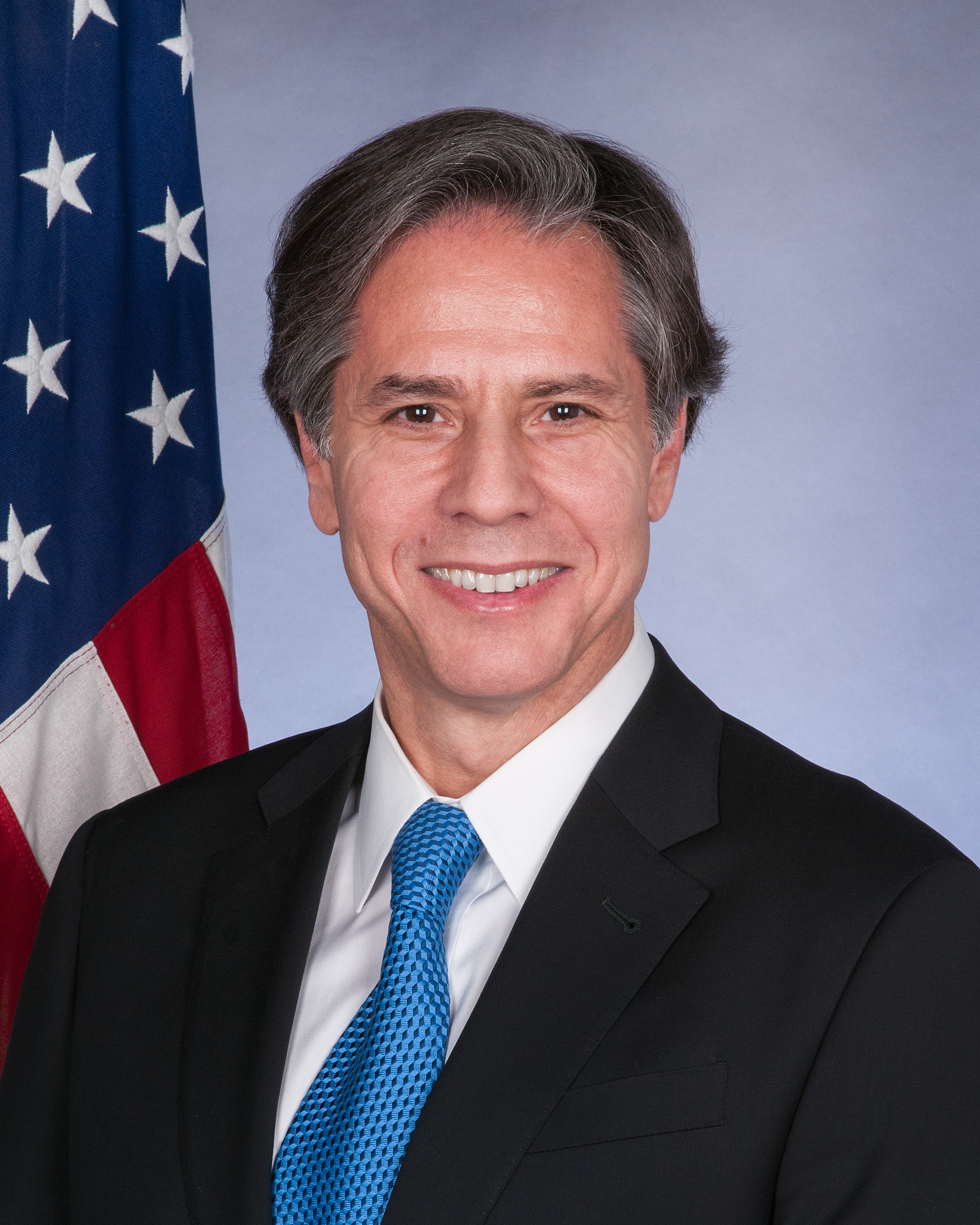
Antony Blinken

- Antony Blinken, 71st United States Secretary of State
- William F. Bleakley (1883–1969), attorney, judge and politician who was the first Westchester County Executive.
- Jamaal Bowman (born 1976), U.S. representative
- Alfred DelBello, former mayor of Yonkers
- Belle Moskowitz, reformer and political advisor to former Governor of New York Alfred E. Smith
- Mike Spano, Mayor of Yonkers
- Samuel J. Tilden, former governor of New York and winner of the popular vote in the disputed Presidential Election of 1876
- Nick Wasicsko, mayor during low-income housing controversy, 1988–1989; John F. Kennedy Profile in Courage Award runner-up
- Malcolm Wilson, former Governor of New York

== Sports ==
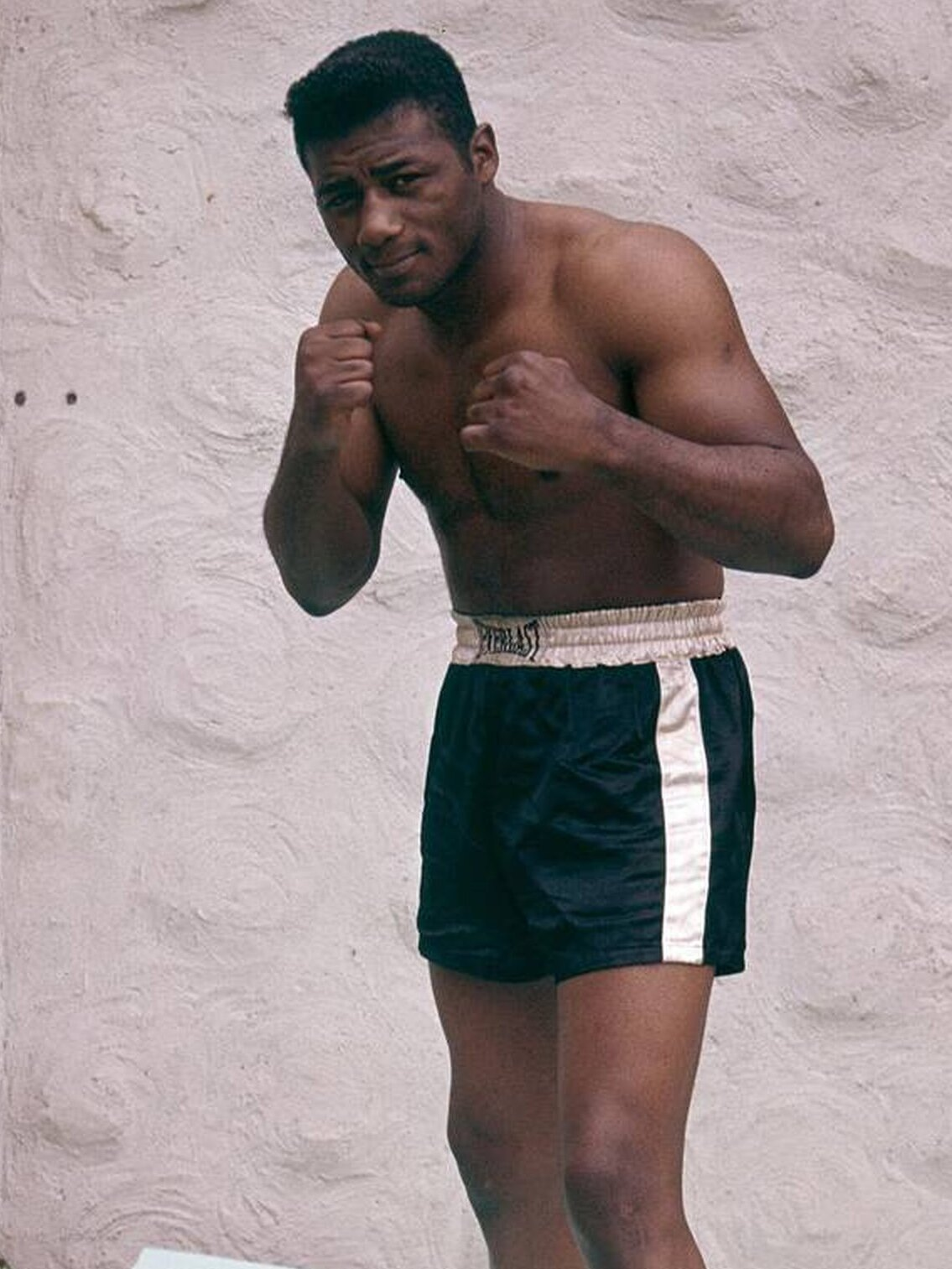
Floyd Patterson

- Joe Avezzano, American football player and coach
- Rich Bisaccia, NFL coach
- James Blake (born 1979), tennis player
- Billy Burch (1900–1950), professional hockey player who was the first American-born player to win the Hart Trophy
- Dave Costa, NFL player, Saunders HS 1957–1959
- Jon Dalzell (born 1960), American-Israeli basketball player
- Doug DeWitt, professional boxer
- Tommy Dreamer, professional wrestler
- Ralph Goldstein (1913–1997), 3-time Olympic épée fencer
- Nealon Greene, professional football player (CFL)
- Sean Kilpatrick, professional basketball player
- Eddie Kingston, professional wrestler
- Allan Kwartler (1917–1998), sabre and foil fencer, Pan American Games and Maccabiah Games champion, 3-time Olympian
- Joe Lapchick (1900–1970), basketball coach.
- Ryan Meara (born 1990), professional soccer player
- Larry Mann (1930–1952), NASCAR driver
- Zacharia Ofri, Olympic basketball player
- Joe Panik, professional baseball player
- Floyd Patterson, champion heavyweight boxer
- Eulace Peacock, track and field athlete who defeated Jesse Owens in sprints
- Vincent Richards, professional tennis player
- Steve Ridzik, professional baseball player
- Bill Roth, gymnast
- Brian Sweeney, professional baseball player
- Salvatore Tripoli, Olympic boxer
- Trill Williams, cornerback for the Miami Dolphins
- George Wright, baseball pioneer

== Writers/journalists ==
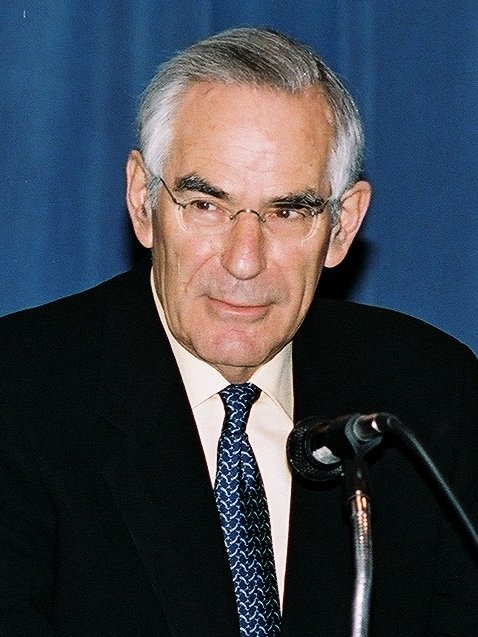
David Halberstam

- Lisa Belkin, journalist and author
- Mike Breen (born 1961), sports broadcaster
- Mary Calvi, news anchor
- Robert Celestino, writer and director
- Avram Davidson,writer of fantasy fiction, science fiction, and crime fiction
- Tiziano Thomas Dossena, writer, editor
- Lawrence Ferlinghetti, poet, painter, social activist, and co-founder of City Lights Booksellers & Publishers
- Tawny Godin, Miss America 1976, TV journalist (Tawny Little)
- David Halberstam, writer, journalist, and historian; won a Pulitzer Prize for International Reporting
- Frederick Joseph, author, activist
- E.M. Nathanson, author
- Yoichi Okamoto, photographer who served as the Chief Official White House Photographer
- Patrick Quinlan, author, activist
- Nathan Straus Jr., journalist and politician
- Patricia Vaccarino, writer
- Elsie B. Washington (1942–2009), author
- Meg Wheatley (born 1944), writer, teacher, speaker, and management consultant
