= Our Town (The X-Files) =

- The X-Files episode
- A man wears a sacrificial mask. Director Rob Bowman found scenes featuring the mask the most difficult to shoot.
- Episode no.: Season 2 Episode 24
- Directed by: Rob Bowman
- Written by: Frank Spotnitz
- Production code: 2X24
- Original air date: May 12, 1995
- Running time: 44 minutes

Guest appearances
- Caroline Kava as Doris Kearns; John Milford as Walter Chaco; Gary Grubbs as Sheriff Arens; Timothy Webber as Jess Harold; John MacLaren as George Kearns; Robin Mossley as Dr. Vance Randolph; Gabrielle Miller as Paula Gray

Episode chronology
| ← Previous "Soft Light" | Next → "Anasazi" |
- The X-Files season 2

"Our Town" is the twenty-fourth episode of the second season of the American science fiction television series The X-Files. It premiered on the Fox network in the United States on May 12, 1995. It was written by Frank Spotnitz and directed by Rob Bowman. The episode is a "Monster-of-the-Week" story, unconnected to the series' wider mythology. "Our Town" received a Nielsen rating of 9.4 and was watched by 9.0 million households. The episode received mixed reviews from critics.

The show centers on FBI special agents Fox Mulder (David Duchovny) and Dana Scully (Gillian Anderson) who work on cases linked to the paranormal, called X-Files. Mulder is a believer in the paranormal, while the skeptical Scully has been assigned to debunk his work. In this episode, Dudley, Arkansas, is the site of the latest investigation for Mulder and Scully, who are sent to find a missing poultry inspector. The case takes a twist when another poultry worker is shot after she goes insane, leading Mulder to believe that certain townspeople are cannibals.

"Our Town" was future executive producer Spotnitz's first stand-alone episode for the show. Spotnitz was inspired to write the episode after thinking of cannibalism occurring at a chicken processing plant, an idea that he thought was one of the most despicable and vile things. Spotnitz later named the characters after real life cannibals.

== Plot ==
In Dudley, Arkansas, government health inspector George Kearns follows his seemingly young lover, Paula Gray, into the woods. However, after losing track of Paula, Kearns finds himself surrounded by approaching lights in the woods. He is then killed by an axe-wielding assailant wearing a tribal mask.

When Kearns is reported missing and a witness claims to have seen foxfire near Dudley, Fox Mulder (David Duchovny) and Dana Scully (Gillian Anderson) investigate. At the site of the alleged foxfire, the agents find the ground burnt. After visiting Kearns' wife Doris, the agents discover that he was about to recommend a local chicken plant, Chaco Chicken, to be closed down for health violations. While giving the agents a tour of the plant, floor manager Jess Harold claims that Kearns had a vendetta against Chaco Chicken. After hearing this, a hallucinating Paula, who works at the plant, grabs and holds Harold at knifepoint. Mulder and Scully attempt to reason with Paula until she is shot and killed by Arens, the local sheriff. The plant's physician, Dr. Vance Randolph, later claims that Paula was suffering from consistent headaches, which Kearns had also reported.

The agents meet Walter Chaco, Paula's grandfather and the plant's owner, who allows the agents to perform an autopsy. The agents find that while Paula's personnel file gives her age as 47, she appears no older than her mid-20s. They also discover that Paula suffered from Creutzfeldt–Jakob disease, a rare and fatal illness that causes dementia. When the agents nearly collide with a Chaco Chicken truck, they learn that the driver also suffered from the disease. Noticing the plant's blood-red runoff in a nearby stream, Mulder orders a reluctant Sheriff Arens to dredge it. They quickly find the bones of nine people, including Kearns. While inspecting the remains, the agents notice that the skulls are missing and that the bones appear to have been boiled. Meanwhile, Randolph and Harold discuss the uncovered bones and the increase of Creutzfeldt–Jakob cases. When Randolph complains about Chaco's inaction, Harold assures him that he will talk to Chaco.

Using FBI records, Mulder and Scully find that eighty-seven people have vanished within a two-hundred mile radius of Dudley over the past half-century. Mulder suspects that the town's residents are practicing cannibalism in order to prolong life, possibly explaining Paula's youthful appearance. Mulder discovers that Kearns had Creutzfeldt–Jakob disease, and deduces that the other residents caught the illness after consuming his body. The agents try to search the town's birth records for confirmation of Paula's age, but find that they have been destroyed. At Chaco's mansion, Chaco and Harold meet with Doris, who tearfully implies that she "helped" Chaco kill her husband; Chaco instructs her to obstruct the FBI's investigation.

Doris calls Mulder, believing that Chaco wants to kill her; after she hangs up, she is attacked by the masked figure. Scully goes to help Doris while Mulder searches for Chaco at his mansion. There, he finds the shrunken heads of Kearns and other victims in a cabinet. Mulder calls Scully on the phone and hears her being knocked out by Chaco. She is bound and gagged and taken to a secluded field, where Harold has started a bonfire and led the townsfolk in consuming Doris. Chaco berates them for killing one of their own, but Harold chastises him for allowing the Creutzfeldt–Jakob epidemic to occur and has Chaco executed by the masked figure. Scully is about to be killed when Mulder arrives and shoots the figure; he is revealed to be Sheriff Arens. Harold tries to shoot Mulder, but is trampled to death by the fleeing townsfolk.

In narration, Scully explains that Chaco's plant has been closed down by the USDA, and that twenty-seven Dudley residents have died from Creutzfeldt–Jakob disease. She reveals that Chaco was ninety-three years old at the time of his death, and had spent time with the allegedly cannibalistic "Jale tribe" after his transport plane was shot down over New Guinea during World War II. She also states that his remains have never been found; the final scene suggests that Chaco's remains are being fed to chickens at his plant.

== Production ==
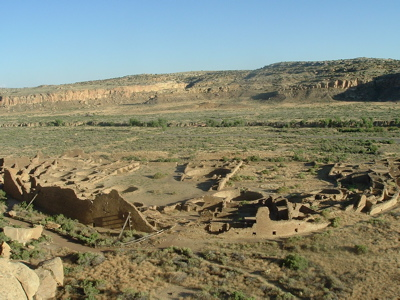
Part of the episode was inspired by Spotnitz's discovery that archaeologists had uncovered boiled human bones in Chaco Canyon, New Mexico (pictured in background).

"Our Town" was written by future executive producer Frank Spotnitz and directed by Rob Bowman. The episode was Spotnitz's first stand-alone episode for the show, and because of that he decided to write about "the most despicable and vile things he could imagine", which in this case was cannibalism occurring at a chicken processing plant. Spotnitz was also inspired by the thriller Bad Day at Black Rock (1955) (about a town that holds a terrible secret) and an article he read while a student at University of California, Los Angeles about salamander cannibalism and how such behavior makes the animals sick. When the episode was being scripted, these ideas were later supplemented with medical research about kuru, a very rare, incurable neurodegenerative disorder that was formerly common among the Fore people of Papua New Guinea.

While researching the Ancestral Puebloans for the second-season finale, Spotnitz learned that archaeologists had discovered boiled human bones in Chaco Canyon, New Mexico—an element featured in the final version of the episode. Spotnitz also used "Chaco" as the name of the chicken plant in this episode. Spotnitz had trouble finding books about cannibalism, but he did glean enough information to name the characters in the episode after real, notable cannibals. Gary Grubbs, the actor who played the sheriff, was later cast as the fire captain in the 1998 X-Files film. Howard Gordon came up with the idea to start the episode with a love affair between George Kearns and Paula Gray.

Of the result, Spotnitz said "I was very pleased with the way it was executed, and I think it was a good mystery." He later wrote that he "liked [it] more as time has gone on." Director Rob Bowman admitted to being exhausted both physically and mentally by the time this episode—the second to last of the season—was produced. This lack of interest later resulted in the episode taking "extra time to finish". Bowman later recalled that the most difficult scene to film was the episode's climax, if only because of the ceremonial mask featured. He explained, "The mask scared the hell out of me only because I thought, 'Boy, if I don't shoot this right, it's going to be silly.'"

== Reception ==
"Our Town" was first broadcast in the United States on May 12, 1995, on the Fox Broadcasting Company. In its original broadcast, it was watched by 9 million households, according to the Nielsen ratings system. It received a 9.4 rating and a 17 share among viewers, meaning that 9.4 percent of all households in the United States and 17 percent of all people watching television at the time, viewed the episode.

The episode received mostly mixed reviews from television critics. In a retrospective review of the second season, Entertainment Weekly gave "Our Town" a C+, describing it as "scary — but mostly because of what transpires in a chicken processing plant." Writing for The A.V. Club, Zack Handlen rated the episode a B−, criticizing the clichéd opening sequence—"Haven't we seen this before? Like, a million times, in dozens of horror movies, and even on this very series"—the bland characters and lack of humor. However, he did compliment the fact that the plot explained enough of the villain's motives and that the episode had "some sense of a community behind everything". Furthermore, he wrote that the resolution worked well despite again resorting to Scully in danger.

Television Without Pity ranked "Our Town" the fifth most nightmare-inducing episode of the show. Robert Shearman, in his book Wanting to Believe: A Critical Guide to The X-Files, Millennium & The Lone Gunmen, rated the episode two stars out of five. Writing positively of Spotnitz juxtapositions, Shearman praised the episode's focus on cannibalism. However, he wrote that "Spotnitz pushes the metaphor too far", citing the ending scene as evidence. Shearman also criticized both Bowman's directing (which he said lacked the flourishes to make "Spotnitz' strange black comedy work") and Mark Snow's score (which Shearman lambasted as "the same horn anthem he gives any character who's taken a little too much from a tribal culture"). Shearman further criticized the series' use of the capture of Scully as a mechanism for Mulder to spring into action.

== Bibliography ==
- Edwards, Ted (1996). X-Files Confidential. Little, Brown and Company. ISBN 0316218081.
- Hurwitz, Matt & Knowles, Chris (2008). The Complete X-Files: Behind the Series the Myths and the Movies. New York, US: Insight Editions. ISBN 978-1933784724.
- Lovece, Frank (1996). The X-Files Declassified. Citadel Press. ISBN 080651745X.
- Lowry, Brian (1995). The Truth is Out There: The Official Guide to the X-Files. Harper Prism. ISBN 0061053309.
- Shearman, Robert (2009). Wanting to Believe: A Critical Guide to The X-Files, Millennium & The Lone Gunmen. Mad Norwegian Press. ISBN 978-0975944691.
