= Bosse Lindquist =

Swedish radio and TV producer and writer (born 1954)

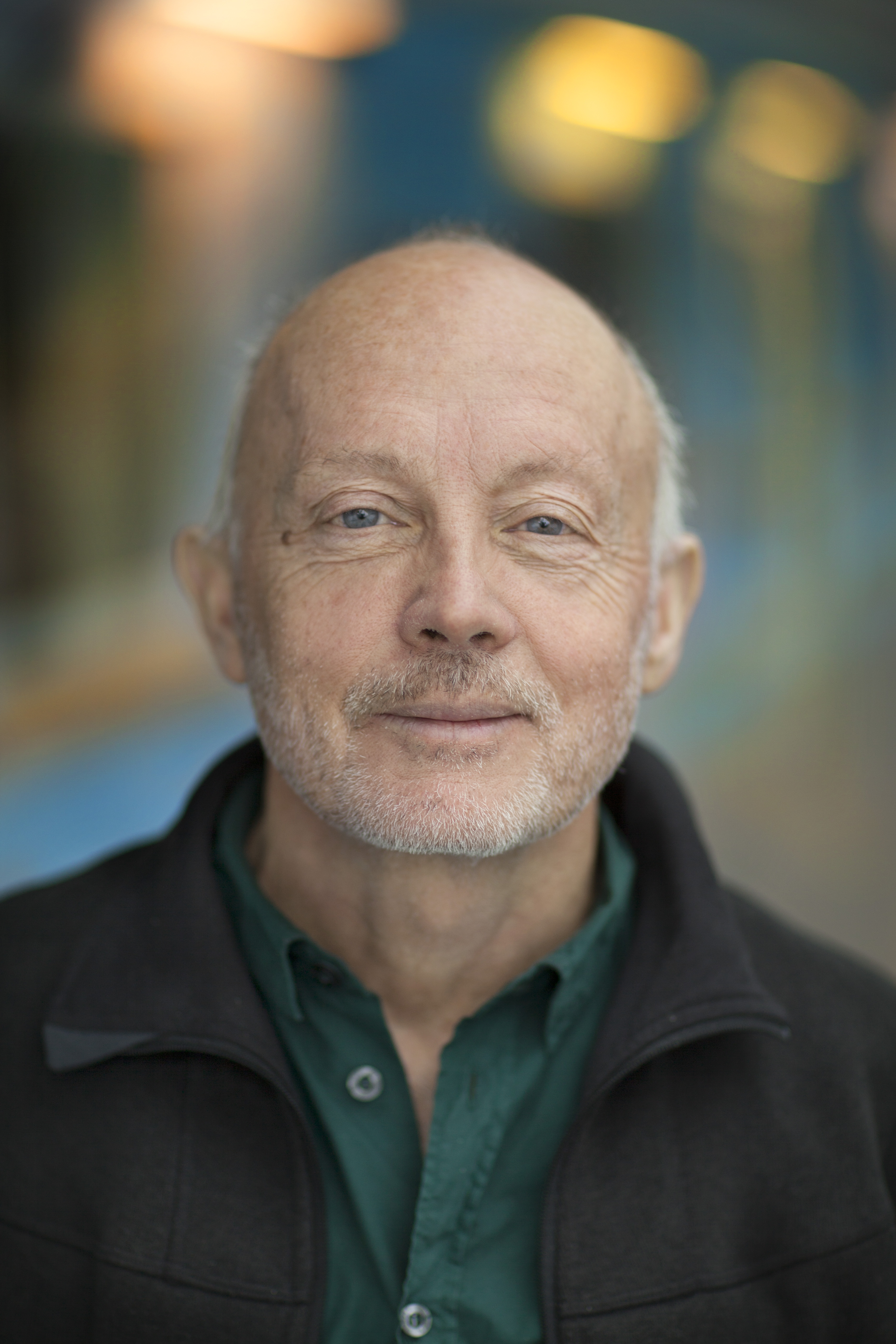
- Bosse Lindquist in November 2016
- Born: 1954 (age 71–72); Stockholm, Sweden
- Citizenship: Swedish

Bosse Lindquist (born 1954) is a Swedish-born documentary director and writer. Medical Doctor honoris causa (MDhc), Linköping University, 2026.

Among Lindquist's internationally acclaimed films are WikiRebels, which was the first documentary about the controversial "radical transparency" platform WikiLeaks and its founder Julian Assange; the docu-series The Experiments, the docuseries that broke the story exposing the so-called “pioneer” of regenerative medicine, Paolo Macchiarini, as a murderous fraud whose serial medical malpractice was concealed by elite medical institutions; and Give Us the Money, a film that examines the real-world impact of rock stars Bono and Bob Geldof’s high-profile, decades-long crusade against poverty, famine, and AIDS in Africa that launched with the 1985 Live Aid concert.

Lindquist’s documentaries and docuseries have aired on many television/streaming outlets around the world (including Arte and the BBC), and won numerous awards, including three Prix Europa, and a Peabody Award.

While mainly working independently, Lindquist served as head of Sweden’s national radio documentary department (2007-2009).

Lindquist is also a fiction and non-fiction writer, and most recently published an investigative essay into the lives of the internationally controversial triad of the Myrdal family - Alva, Gunnar and their son Jan.

== Early life and education ==
Lindquist was born in Stockholm, Sweden. He attended Tibble gymnasium and moved to Kenya 1974 to teach in secondary schools, as well as exporting tropical aquarium fish. He returned to Sweden in 1982.

== Career ==
Lindquist started out as a reporter 1983 within print media covering contemporary African music. His earliest investigative work included an expose about how Sweden had a far longer and – per capita - larger eugenics program of forced sterilizations than Nazi Germany and an investigation that revealed how late 20th-century European leaders and intellectuals who preached human rights had secretly courted Pol Pot’s genocidal regime. Although he has published books throughout his whole career, Lindquist left magazine and newspaper journalism in favor of radio documentaries 1990. After winning ten major awards in seven years for his investigative audio work he moved to film. He was Ander Visiting Professor of Global Media Studies at Karlstad University from 2012 to 2013. He has been a non-fiction author and director of documentaries since 1988.

== Major works ==
Once I was Korean

Lindquist’s debut film peeled back the façade of the tidy story often told about adoption to reveal the knotted emotions and identity struggles of South Korean children raised in new families far from their homeland. The documentary investigated the experiences of the children who were adopted at ages ranging from three to 12 years old. They were given new identities and replacement mother-tongue languages, despite often having well-established Korean identities. The investigations earned Lindquist his third Prix Europa and exemplified a synthesis of emotional intelligence and investigative depth that is among the distinguishing features of his work.

The Genius and the Boys

In this documentary, which premiered on BBC Storyville, Lindquist attempts to understand the split character of the Nobel Prize–winning physician Daniel Carleton Gajdusek, a pediatrician who discovered the Kuru disease among a cannibal tribe in New Guinea and who spent his professional life uncovering medical riddles and saving young lives, whilst in his personal life sometimes destroying them—as an adamant, serial pedophile. The film dives deep into the coexistence of profound intellectual brilliance, as well as failure. The film was officially selected for the IDFA in Amsterdam 2009, and was later shown at documentary festivals in Melbourne, Reykjavik, Thessaloniki, Bergen and Planete Doc Warszaw, among others.

WikRebels

The documentary made about WikiLeaks and its founder, Julian Assange —which aired in 30 countries - secured Lindquist’s reputation as a journalist who perceives history in the making, before others realize it’s unfolding. Lindquist and co-director Jesper Huor captured the group at work, in real-time as they undertook the project—posting almost half a million leaked classified U.S. military documents and diplomatic dispatches in 2010—that transformed WikiLeaks from an obscure website into an international power house and disruptor. The documentary captures the group confronting the consequences—public, personal, and interpersonal of their abrupt rise to fame and their growing awareness that they had shattered long-established boundaries separating journalism, activism, and espionage.

Give Us the Money

Premiering on the BBC and airing in 70 countries, this film won a 2012 U.S. Peabody Award. In it, Lindquist investigates the effectiveness and lasting-impact of celebrity of activism—specifically, Bono and Bob Geldof’s star-driven campaigns, financed partly by Bill Gates, to “save Africa,” which started with the 1985 Live Aid concert.

The Experiments

This docuseries broke the Paolo Macchiarini—or “Bad Surgeon”—scandal. Hailed as a “pioneer of regenerative medicine,” Macchiarini implanted bio-synthetic tracheas in patients in some of the world’s hospitals throughout the early 2010s, under the auspices of the Nobel prize issuing Karolinska Institute. The implants were hailed as miraculous but rotted and collapsed—a fact Lindquist reveals in chilling footage that Macchiarini well knew, yet kept doing the experiments anyway. After he operated on them, all but one of Macchiarini’s implant patients eventually died.

Lindquist’s trilogy exposed not only a rogue doctor but a systemic failure. Prestigious medical institutions protected their reputations, and major news outlets—including The New York Times, CNN, NBC News (in an Emmy-nominated two-hour special), BBC and Arte —celebrated Macchiarini as a medical hero instead of vetting his claims.

The Experiments won the American Association for the Advancement of Science’s Gold Medal, and spawned a cottage industry of successors—a stand-alone documentary, a dramatized miniseries, many podcasts and even a pop song. In addition, based on The Experiments, Netflix commissioned its own Macchiarini documentary trilogy—one that used Lindquist’s footage and featured him on camera. Premiering in 2023, Bad Surgeon: Love Under the Knife became an instant “Top 10” hit for the platform.

== Other works ==
A number of documentaries and books have been translated and broadcast in the UK, Germany, France, Denmark, Norway, Finland and Japan.

A series of documentaries on the state of modern genetics and prenatal diagnostics - Mechanics of Life – won the Prix Futura (now renamed Prix Europa) in Berlin 1995, and was also rewarded with the Ikarosprice for 1993 and the Association of Swedish Investigative Journalists prize for 1993.

The radio-documentary The Rebels – about an extreme and secret Swedish maoist group got the Ikarosprize 1997 and together with Swedish Eugenics– about Sweden's forced sterilization of women for eugenic reasons– the Vilhelm Moberg grant in 1997. Bring the Jews Last - produced by Mikael Cohen - got a special commendation at Prix Italia 1998 as well as the prize of the law and history faculties of the Stockholm university 1998. The Silence of Phnom Penh – about Swedish support of the Pol Pot regime and also produced by Mikael Cohen – won the Prix Europa in Berlin 2000, the Association of Swedish Investigative Journalists prize and the Ikarosprize for 1999.

May 2010, Lindquist released an investigation into systematic malpractices within the McDonald's Corporation. The documentary McCheat & Co was produced for SVT - Sveriges Television – and showed systematic practicing of hour-shaving off its employees meagre salaries in Sweden and the United States.

Double Bookkeeping exposed financial and auditing mispractices and illegalities at global forestry giant Stora Enso, 2013, and "Car Burning as Job Hunting" - on urban riots in Swedish suburbs 2014.

Lindquist has introduced a new format for translated radio - RadioVideo. The new technique makes it possible to download radio programs with sub-titles for the computer, mpeg3 player and cell-phone.

== Production ==
=== Published ===
- Förädlade svenskar, Alfabeta 1991
- Rullstol och varm korv, with Walter Hirsch, Publisher: LL-förlaget, 1991. Translated into German 1995.
- Kärlek i vått och torrt, with Walter Hirsch, Publisher: LL-förlaget, 1993. Translated into German 1995.
- Genguiden, with Robert Nyberg, Publisher: Alfabeta 1995
- Hakkors och skinnskallar - rasism från Auschwitz till Vålberg, with Kurdo Baksi, Robert Blombäck & Susanne Berglind, Publisher: LL-förlaget 1998.
- ”Om rasistiska brott i nyheterna”, in Vita redaktioner, mörk magi, Ylva Brune ed, Publisher: Carlssons 1998.
- Macchiarini affären - om sanningar och lögner på Karolinska, Publisher: Albert Bonniers, 2018

=== Television documentaries ===
- Once, I was Korean, 2002 (Director, with film-maker Bo Öhlén)
- Vad är det för fel på Socialen? 2003 (Exec. producer)
- In the Name of God – on the Church and the Rwandan genocide 2004 (Exec. producer)
- The Rebels 2005 (Director)
- Feminism in the Social-Democrat Party 2006 (Exec. producer)
- The Genius and the Boys, 2009 (Director)
- McCheat & Co, 2010 (Director)
- WikiRebels, 2010 (Director, with co-producer Jesper Huor)
- Give Us the Money, 2012
- Experimenten / Fatal Experiments: The Downfall of a Supersurgeon, 2016

=== Radio documentaries ===
- Vällingby i Afrika, 1988
- Förädlade svenskar - rashygien och sterilisering, 1990
- Bland tinnar och torn, 1992
- Prinsessans fängelse, 1996
- Aftonbladet och hotbilderna, 2000
- The series Livets mekano - om genetik, slump och miljö:
  - En forskardröm, 1993
  - Blodsband, 1993
  - Vem ska få leva?, 1993
- The series En vit fläck på kartan - om ett vitt paradis i Afrika:
  - Pionjärer, 1995
  - Friherrinnans fristad, 1995
  - Den gränslöse kolonisatören, 1995
- The series Svarta Sverige - om främlingsfientlighet i Sverige:
  - Statslös Lucia, 1996
  - Invandrare, född i Vålberg, 1996
- The series En studie i borgerlighet - om svenska maoister:
  - Östern är röd, 1997
  - Elitpartiet, 1997
  - Rebellerna / The Rebels, 1997
- The series Flyktingströmmar från nazi-Tyskland till Sverige:
  - Ta judarna sist/Bring the Jews last, 1998
  - Sverige och de baltiska SS-männen, 1998
- The series about Sweden and the Khmer Rouge:
  - Tystnaden i Phnom Pehn / The silence of Phnom Penh, 1999
  - I revolutionens hjärta, 1999
- The series Adoption:
  - Varför är jag här?, 2002
  - Svensk adoption, 2002

== Sources ==
- Swedish Radio Documentary dept Swedish Radio Documentary Dept.
- SVT Swedish television Documentary Department SVT Dokumentär
- Ordfront Magazine
- Karlstad University
