= Vaccarino =

Vaccarino is a surname. Notable people with the surname include:

- Donald X. Vaccarino (born 1969), American board and card game designer
- Franco Vaccarino (fl. 1984), Canadian neuroscientist
- Patricia Vaccarino (fl. 2009), American writer
