= Caroline Kava =

American dramatist

- Born: September 25, 1949 (age 77); Chicago, Illinois, U.S.
- Occupations: Actress, playwright
- Website: www.carolinekava.com

Caroline Kava (born September 25, 1949) is an American actress and playwright of the 1986 Off-Broadway play, The Early Girl.

She portrayed a prostitute in the 1980 film Heaven's Gate. In Year of the Dragon (1985), she portrayed the wife of Mickey Rourke's character. In Little Nikita (1988), she portrayed the mother of the title character played by River Phoenix. She also played the mother of Ron Kovic, portrayed by Tom Cruise, in Born on the Fourth of July (1989). She has also appeared in television films such as Act of Vengeance (1986) and Guilty Until Proven Innocent (1991). Kava also appeared with Alan Arkin in Four Days in September (1997).

In 1976, Kava appeared as Polly in Threepenny Opera for Joe Papp's New York Shakespeare Festival at the Vivian Beaumont Theater at Lincoln Center.

In 2009, Kava adapted Henrik Ibsen's Hedda Gabler for the Mauckingbird Theatre Company in Philadelphia.

== Filmography ==
=== Film ===
Year	Title	Role	Notes
1980	Heaven's Gate	Stefka	
1985	Year of the Dragon	Connie White	
1988	Little Nikita	Elizabeth Grant	
1989	Born on the Fourth of July	Patricia Kovic	
1997	Four Days in September	Elvira Elbrick	
1999	Snow Falling on Cedars	Helen Chambers	
2005	Everything Good	Madam	Short

=== Television ===
Year	Title	Role	Notes
1976	Ivan the Terrible	Sonia Petrovsky	Main role
1986	Act of Vengeance	Charlotte Yablonski	TV film
1986	Nobody's Child	Dr. Blackwell	TV film
1986	The Equalizer	Mercenary Recruiter	Episode: "Shades of Darkness"
1987	Max Headroom	Harriet Garth	Episode: "Grossberg's Return"
1988	Body of Evidence	Jean	TV film
1988	Internal Affairs	Jean Harp	TV film
1989	The Equalizer		Episode: "Race Traitors"
1990	Murder in Black and White	Jean	TV film
1990	Quantum Leap	Thelma Beckett	Episode: "The Leap Home: Part 1"
1990	Murder Times Seven	Jean Harp	TV film
1991	Guilty Until Proven Innocent	Mary Hohne	TV film
1991	In a Child's Name	Janice Miller	TV miniseries
1991	Law & Order	Rose Schwimmer	"Life Choice"
1992	Star Trek: The Next Generation	Dr. Toby Russell	Episode: "Ethics"
1992	Jumpin' Joe	Irene Dugan	TV film
1993	L.A. Law	Mrs. Clark	Episode: "Cold Shower"
1995	The X-Files	Doris Kearns	Episode: "Our Town"
1996	Shattered Mind	Martha Treymayne	TV film
1996	Law & Order	Betty Abrams	Episode: "Corruption"
1998	Dawson's Creek	Mrs. McPhee	Episodes: "Full Moon Rising", "The Reluctant Hero"
2000	The Practice	Mary Donovan	Episodes: "Death Penalties", "Till Death Do Us Part", "Liberty Bells"
2001	100 Centre Street	Mrs. Truskie	Episode: "Love Stories"
2001	Third Watch	Grace Owens	Episode: "The Relay"
2004	Strip Search	Alvira Sykes	TV film
2005	Law & Order: Trial by Jury	Vivian Gleason	Episode: "Day"
2011	Oklahoma!	Aunt Eller	TV film
