= Give Us the Money =

- Film poster
- Directed by: Bosse Lindquist
- Produced by: David Herdies
- Cinematography: Sven Lindahl
- Edited by: Rodney Guest
- Music by: Andreas Kleerup; Markus Enochson
- Release date: November 26, 2012 (IDFA)
- Running time: 58 minutes
- Countries: Sweden; US; UK; Ethiopia
- Languages: English; Tigrinya

Give Us the Money is a 2012 documentary film made by the Swedish director Bosse Lindquist. The film is produced by Momento Film and is a part of the cross media project Why Poverty?

The film explores the Live Aid campaign that Midge Ure and Bob Geldof started 1985. With the film Lindquist wants to examine if charity from celebrities really can fight poverty.
