= Vincent Zigas =

Physician in Papua New Guinea (1920–1983)

Vincent Zigas (1920–1983) was a medical officer of the Kainantu Sub-District in Papua New Guinea during the 1950s and was one of the first Western medical officials to note the uniqueness of kuru and begin to investigate it. He is listed in many early academic writings about kuru. Little is known his life and work.

Zigas was born in Tallinn, Estonia, in 1920 and little is known about his early life. He is reported to have studied medicine at a number of European universities including those in Kaunas, Königsberg, Breslau, and Hamburg, and spoke a number of different languages. In 1948, he moved to Australia. After a four month course at the Australian School of Pacific Administration taught by Camilla Wedgewood and James McAuley (spelled McCauley by Zigas), Zigas went to Papua New Guinea in 1950 where he was the only medical officer in his region. It was here that he began to hear rumors of a unique illness characterized by body tremors, ataxia, and uncontrollable laughter found only in the Fore tribe that the locals attributed to sorcery. These rumors led him to seek out the Fore and he began to look into this disease, known by the locals as kuru which meant "to shiver."

While certain accounts say that D. Carleton Gajdusek simply appeared in Papua New Guinea, others note that his trip spurred from a connection in Australia. Regardless of how Gajdusek arrived, the American physician immediately began to pepper Zigas with questions surrounding the mysterious disease kuru and in that year (1957), Zigas introduced Gajdusek to the Fore tribe. After conducting autopsies, attempting treatments, and characterizing the illness, together, Zigas and Gajdusek published "Degenerative Disease of the Central Nervous System in New Guinea — The Endemic Occurrence of Kuru in the Native Population" in the New England Journal of Medicine in November 1957. While this article noted the manifestations of kuru, its associated geography, and certain findings from lab tests and autopsies, the authors could only speculate on the disease's cause and how it was transmitted. More importantly, this article put kuru on the map and served as an introduction to future investigations into the origins, transmission, and causes of it. In the years after these investigations, Zigas published two autobiographical books about his time in Papua New Guinea characterizing kuru. The first, Auscultation of Two Worlds was published in 1978 and the second, Laughing Death, was published posthumously in 1990. End note: Dr Vin Zigas is survived by his eldest son, Dr Misha Zigas who was a boy intrigued by the research of Carlton and his father and got to know many Fore tribesmen. Vin and Carltons field notes are still with Misha today.
