= Shirley Lindenbaum =

Australian anthropologist

- Born: 1932 (age 93–94); Australia

Academic background
- Education: University of Melbourne (BA); University of Sydney (MA)

Academic work
- Discipline: Anthropologist
- Sub-discipline: Ethnology; Medical anthropology
- Institutions: CUNY Graduate Center; New School for Social Research

Shirley Inglis Lindenbaum is an Australian anthropologist notable for her medical anthropology work on kuru in Papua New Guinea, HIV/AIDS in the United States of America, and cholera in Bangladesh.

== Education ==
Lindenbaum earned a Bachelor of Arts degree from the University of Melbourne in 1955. In 1971, she received a Master of Arts from the University of Sydney. In 1972, she was granted a PhD waiver from the Graduate Center of the City University of New York, enabling her to become an assistant professor of anthropology there without having obtained her PhD.

== Career ==
Beginning in 1972, Lindenbaum taught cultural anthropology at the Graduate Faculty of The New School for Social Research in New York City, before accepting a professorship at the City University of New York. She was the editor of the international journal American Ethnologist from 1984 to 1989, and later served as Book Review Editor for Anthropology Now from 2010 to 2013.

Lindenbaum currently lives in New York and is emerita professor of the Graduate Center of the City University of New York.

== Research on kuru ==
Lindenbaum began her investigative work on the cause of kuru in 1961. With her colleague and then-husband Robert Glasse, she did two years of fieldwork in the highlands of Papua New Guinea using a research grant from Henry Bennett of the Rockefeller Foundation. Bennett believed that kuru had a genetic origin, so he suggested that Lindenbaum and Glasse study Fore kinship. The two studied kinship in addition to oral histories, beliefs, and practices, while taking epidemiological notes on the disease itself.

Lindenbaum and Glasse discovered that Fore kinship was not based strictly on biology, but rather it was determined by bonding with neighboring individuals. As a result, families were not described as nuclear families: "Instead of depth, the Fore relied on lateral expansions of relatedness." This finding was notable because kuru was not strongly correlated with biological relationships, but rather kin in this more extended sense.

During this time, Lindenbaum and Glasse also discovered that the Fore people partook in a ritual called mortuary cannibalism, where kin honored the dead by feasting on their cooked bodies. People avoided eating kin who died of dysentery and leprosy, but did not shy away from eating people who died of kuru. Through oral histories, it was determined that the kuru epidemic had begun among the northernmost Fore at the turn of the century, some time in the 1890s. It is now presumed that a spontaneous case of Creutzfeldt Jacob Disease (like kuru, a prion-related disorder) occurred at that time. When that person died and was consumed by kin, the kuru epidemic spread further south. Lindenbaum and Glasse noted also that the geographic spread of kuru closely matched the practice of mortuary cannibalism throughout this region, providing substantial evidence that cannibalism was the mode of transmission. Moreover, the research team noted that women and children were primarily impacted by kuru, which correlated with mortuary cannibalism practices. Men were less likely than women to partake in mortuary cannibalism, and when they did, they were less likely to eat women. As a result, men were less likely to get kuru compared to women and children. Lindenbaum's work was originally resisted by genetic and biomedical researchers who insisted that the disease was likely genetic and non-infectious.

This research contributed substantially to the current understanding of the nature and transmission of kuru. Since this research, Lindenbaum has written several reflections, articles, and books about kuru and the Fore people. Most importantly, her work led to the discovery of prion-communicable diseases, of which kuru was found to be one.

Lindenbaum was honoree for the year 2017 of the journal of Culture, Medicine and Psychiatry. An essay on her career appeared in the December 2017 issue of that journal.

== Selected bibliography ==
- Lindenbaum, Shirley (2008). "Understanding Kuru: The Contribution of Anthropology and Medicine". Philosophical Transactions of the Royal Society B: Biological Sciences. 363 (1510): 3715–3720. doi:10.1098/rstb.2008.0072. PMC 2735506. PMID 18849287.
- Lindenbaum, Shirley (2013). Kuru Sorcery: Disease and Danger in the New Guinea Highlands (2nd ed.). Paradigm Publishers. ISBN 978-1612052755.
- Lindenbaum, Shirley (2015). "An Annotated History of Kuru". Medicine Anthropology Theory. 2 (1): 95–126. doi:10.17157/mat.2.1.217.
