= Kuru (disease) =

Rare neurodegenerative disease caused by prions

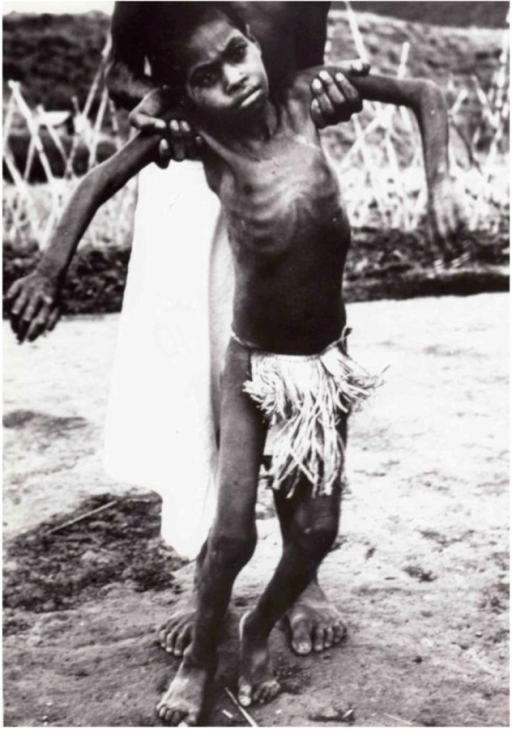
- A Fore child with advanced kuru.
- Pronunciation: /ˈkʊ.ɹuː/
- Specialty: Neuropathology, infectious disease
- Symptoms: Body tremors, random outbursts of laughter, emotional degradation, gradual loss of coordination
- Complications: Infection and pneumonia during the terminal stage.
- Usual onset: 5 to 50 years after initial exposure
- Duration: 11 to 14 months' life expectancy after onset of symptoms
- Causes: Transmission of infectious prion proteins
- Risk factors: Cannibalism, especially consumption of human brains
- Diagnostic method: Autopsy
- Differential diagnosis: Creutzfeldt–Jakob disease
- Prevention: Not eating infected humans
- Treatment: Supportive care
- Prognosis: Always fatal
- Frequency: Extinct (last case in 2009)
- Deaths: Approximately 2,700

Kuru was a rare, incurable, and fatal neurodegenerative disorder that was formerly common among the Fore people of Papua New Guinea. It was a prion disease that caused tremors and loss of coordination from neurodegeneration. The term kúru means 'trembling' and comes from the Fore word kuria or guria ("to shake"). It is also known as "laughing sickness" due to abnormal bursts of laughter from the patients.

It was spread among the Fore people via funerary cannibalism: deceased family members were traditionally cooked and eaten, which was thought to help free the spirit of the dead. Women and children usually ate the brain, where infectious prions were most concentrated, and therefore were more commonly affected. The outbreak likely originated from a villager developing sporadic Creutzfeldt–Jakob disease, which then spread to others via the consumption of the deceased's brain.

Due to a ban by the Australian administration of the Territory of Papua and New Guinea, the Fore had largely stopped eating human flesh around 1960, years before any connection between cannibalism and kuru was seriously considered. However, this did not quickly stop the emergence of new cases, due to the long incubation period of the disease, which can extend to over 50 years. Around 1957, during the peak of the outbreak, about 200 people died of the disease every year. More than half a century later, the outbreak ended, with the two last known deaths occurring in 2005 and 2009.

== Signs and symptoms ==
Kuru, a transmissible spongiform encephalopathy, is a disease of the nervous system that causes physiological and neurological effects which ultimately lead to death. It is characterized by progressive cerebellar ataxia, or loss of coordination and control over muscle movements.

The preclinical or asymptomatic phase, also called the incubation period, averages 10–13 years, but can be as short as five and has been estimated to last as long as 50 years or more after initial exposure.

The clinical stage, which begins at the first onset of symptoms, lasts an average of 12 months. The clinical progression of kuru is divided into three specific stages: ambulant, sedentary, and terminal. While there is some variation in these stages from individual to individual, they are highly conserved among the affected population. Before the onset of clinical symptoms, an individual can also present with prodromal symptoms including headache and joint pain in the legs.

=== Ambulant stage ===
In the ambulant stage, so called because the individual is still able to walk despite symptoms, the infected individual may exhibit unsteady stance and gait, decreased muscle control, difficulty pronouncing words (dysarthria), and tremors (titubation).

=== Sedentary stage ===
In the sedentary stage, the infected individual is incapable of walking without support and experiences ataxia and severe tremors. Furthermore, the individual shows signs of emotional instability and depression, yet exhibits uncontrolled and sporadic laughter. Despite the other neurological symptoms, tendon reflexes remain intact at this stage of the disease.

=== Terminal stage ===
In the terminal stage, the infected individual's existing symptoms, like ataxia, progress to the point where it is no longer possible to sit up without support. New symptoms also emerge: the individual develops dysphagia (difficulty swallowing), which can lead to severe malnutrition, and may also become incontinent, lose the ability or will to speak, and become unresponsive to their surroundings despite maintaining consciousness. Towards the end of the terminal stage, those infected often develop chronic decubitus ulcerated wounds that can be easily infected. An infected person usually dies within three months to two years after the first terminal stage symptoms, often because of aspiration pneumonia or other secondary infections.

=== Neuropathology ===
Studies from those infected with kuru have revealed explanations for the effects that the disease can have on the brain. In the early stages of the disease, infected people may experience withdrawal, poor coordination, tremors, and curling of the toes and feet. To understand the difficulties in balance and coordination, studies were conducted to analyse the brains of infected individuals. These studies found that neurons in a kuru-infected brain were abnormally small and lighter in color compared to their healthy counterparts. Affected neurons appear "moth-eaten" due to their characteristic deformations. These abnormalities in the neurons of the brain infected by kuru were similar to those with Creutzfeldt–Jakob disease (CJD).

== Causes ==
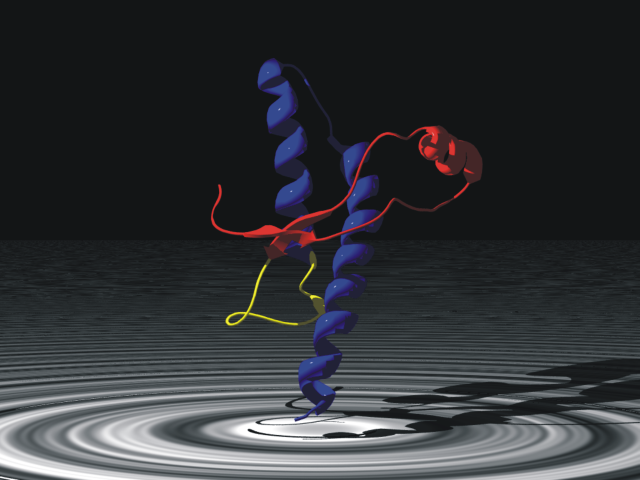
Normally folded prion protein PrP^{C} subdomain-Residues 125–228. Note the presence of alpha helices (blue).

Kuru is largely localized to the Fore people and people with whom they intermarried. The Fore people ritualistically cooked and consumed body parts of their family members following their death to incorporate "the body of the dead person into the bodies of living relatives, thus helping to free the spirit of the dead". Because infectious prions are particularly concentrated in the brain, women and children – the primary consumers of the brain matter – had a much higher likelihood of being infected than men, who typically consumed muscle.

=== Prion ===
The infectious agent is a misfolded form of a host-encoded protein called prion (PrP). Prion proteins are encoded by the Prion Protein Gene (PRNP). The two forms of prion are designated as PrP^{C}, which is a normally folded protein, and PrP^{Sc}, a misfolded form which gives rise to the disease. The two forms do not differ in their amino acid sequence; however, the pathogenic PrP^{Sc} isoform differs from the normal PrP^{C} form in its secondary and tertiary structure. The PrP^{Sc} isoform is more enriched in beta sheets, while the normal PrP^{C} form is enriched in alpha helices. The differences in conformation allow PrP^{Sc} to aggregate and be extremely resistant to protein degradation by enzymes or other chemical and physical means. The normal form, on the other hand, is susceptible to complete proteolysis and soluble in non-denaturing detergents.

It has been suggested that pre-existing or acquired PrP^{Sc} can promote the conversion of PrP^{C} into PrP^{Sc}, which goes on to convert other PrP^{C}. This initiates a chain reaction that enables its rapid propagation, resulting in the pathogenesis of prion diseases.

=== Transmission ===
In 1961, Australian medical researcher Michael Alpers and anthropologist Shirley Lindenbaum conducted extensive field studies among the Fore. Their historical research suggested the epidemic may have originated at the beginning of the 1900s from a single individual who lived on the edge of Fore territory and who is thought to have spontaneously developed some form of Creutzfeldt–Jakob disease. Alpers and Lindenbaum's research conclusively demonstrated that kuru spread easily and rapidly in the Fore people due to their endocannibalistic funeral practices, in which relatives consumed the bodies of the dead to return the person's "life force" to the hamlet, a Fore social subunit.

The demographic distribution evident in the infection rates – kuru was eight to nine times more prevalent in women and children than in men at its peak – is because Fore men considered consuming human flesh to weaken them in times of conflict or battle. The women and children were more likely to eat the bodies of the deceased, including the brain, where the prion particles were particularly concentrated. Also, the strong possibility exists that it was passed on to women and children more easily because they took on the task of cleaning relatives after death and might have had open sores and cuts on their hands.

Although ingestion of prion particles can lead to infection, a high degree of transmission occurred if the prion particles reached subcutaneous tissue. With the elimination of cannibalism because of Australian colonial law enforcement and local Christian missionaries' efforts, Alpers' research showed that kuru was already declining among the Fore by the mid‑1960s. However, the mean incubation period of the disease is 14 years, and seven cases were reported with latencies of 40 years or more for those who were most genetically resilient, continuing to appear for several more decades. The last person known to have been infected with kuru died in 2009.

== Diagnosis ==
Kuru is diagnosed by reviewing the individual's history of cerebellar signs and symptoms, performing neurological exams, and excluding other neurological diseases. The symptoms evaluated are typically coordination issues and involuntary muscle movements, but these markers can be confused with other diseases that affect the nervous and muscle system; physical scans are often required to differentiate kuru from other disorders. There is no laboratory test to determine the presence of kuru except for postmortem evaluation of central nervous system (CNS) tissues, so diagnoses are achieved by eliminating other possible disorders.

Electroencephalogram (EEG) is used to distinguish kuru from Creutzfeldt–Jakob disease, a similar encephalopathy (any disease that affects the brain structure). EEGs search for electrical activity in the person's brain and measure the frequency of each wave to determine if there is an issue with the brain's activity. Periodic complexes (PC), reoccurring patterns with spike wave-complexes occurring at intervals, are recorded frequently in some diseases but are not presented in the kuru readings. Exams and testing, like EEGs, MRIs, blood tests, and scans can be used to determine if the infected person is dealing with kuru or another encephalopathy. However, testing over periods of time can be difficult.

== Resistance ==
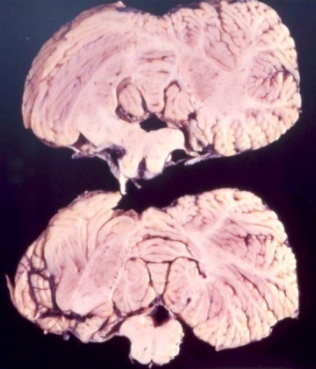
Cerebellum of a person infected with kuru

In 2009, researchers at the Medical Research Council discovered a naturally occurring variant of a prion protein (PrnP) in a population from Papua New Guinea that confers strong resistance to kuru. In the study, which began in 1996, researchers assessed over 3,000 people from the affected and surrounding Eastern Highland populations, and identified a variation in the prion protein: G127V (replacement of the glycine at position 127 with valine). G127V polymorphism is the result of a missense mutation, and is highly geographically restricted to regions where the kuru epidemic was the most widespread. Researchers believe that the PrnP variant occurred very recently, estimating that the most recent common ancestor lived 10 generations ago.

The findings of the study could help researchers better understand and develop treatments for other related prion diseases, such as Creutzfeldt–Jakob disease and other neurodegenerative diseases like Alzheimer's disease.

== History ==
Kuru was first described in official reports by Australian kiaps (field officers) patrolling the Eastern Highlands of Papua New Guinea in the early 1950s. Some unofficial accounts place kuru in the region as early as 1910. In 1951, Arthur Carey was the first to use the term kuru in a report to describe a new disease afflicting the Fore tribes of Papua New Guinea (PNG). In his report, Carey noted that kuru mostly affected Fore women, eventually killing them. Kuru was noted in the Fore, Yate and Usurufa people in 1952–1953 by anthropologists Ronald Berndt and Catherine Berndt. In 1953, kuru was observed by patrol officer John McArthur, who described the disease in his report. McArthur believed that kuru was merely a psychosomatic episode resulting from the sorcery practices of the tribal people in the region. After the disease had progressed into a larger epidemic, the tribal people asked Charles Pfarr, a Lutheran medical officer, to come to the area to report the disease to Australian authorities.

Initially, the Fore people believed the causes of kuru to be sorcery or witchcraft. They also thought that the magic causing kuru was contagious. It was also called negi-nagi, which meant 'foolish person' as the victims laughed at spontaneous intervals. This disease, the Fore people believed, was caused by ghosts, because of the shaking and strange behaviour that comes with kuru. Attempting to cure this, they would feed victims casuarina bark.

When kuru had become an epidemic, Daniel Carleton Gajdusek, a virologist, and Vincent Zigas, another physician, started research on the disease. In 1957, Zigas and Gajdusek published a report in the Medical Journal of Australia that suggested that kuru had a genetic origin, and that "any ethnic-environmental variables that are operating in kuru pathogenesis have not yet been determined." In 1960, the administration discussed a plan to eugenically quarantine the Fore, preventing them from intermarrying or leaving their traditional land in order to contain the spread of kuru, which was theorized to be hereditary.

Cannibalism was suspected as a possible cause from the beginning but was not formally put forth as a hypothesis until 1967 by Glasse and more formally in 1968 by Mathews, Glasse, and Lindenbaum. Long before this hypothesis and unrelated to it, cannibalism had been banned by the Australian administration of Papua New Guinea, and as a funerary rite it was nearly eliminated by 1960. From the 1960s, medical researchers were able to properly investigate kuru, which eventually led to the modern understanding of prions as its cause.

In an effort to understand the pathology of kuru disease, Gajdusek established the first experimental tests on chimpanzees for kuru at the US National Institutes of Health (NIH). Michael Alpers, an Australian doctor, collaborated with Gajdusek by providing samples of brain tissues he had taken from an 11-year-old Fore girl who had died of kuru. In his work, Gajdusek was also the first to compile a bibliography of kuru disease. Joe Gibbs joined Gajdusek to monitor and record the behaviour of the apes at the NIH and conduct their autopsies. Within two years, one of the chimps, Daisy, had developed kuru, demonstrating that an unknown disease factor was transmitted through infected biomaterial and that it was capable of crossing the species barrier to other primates. After Elisabeth Beck confirmed that this experiment had brought about the first experimental transmission of kuru, the finding was deemed a very important advance in human medicine, leading to the award of the Nobel Prize in Physiology or Medicine to Gajdusek in 1976.

Subsequently, E. J. Field spent large parts of the late 1960s and early 1970s in New Guinea investigating the disease, connecting it to scrapie and multiple sclerosis. He noted the disease's interactions with glial cells, including the critical observation that the infectious process may depend on the structural rearrangement of the host's molecules.

== In popular culture ==
- Playwright Josh C. Manheimer wrote a stage comedy—itself called Kuru—about the discovery of the disease. It was debuted in the premiere season of the Purple Rose Theatre Company, 1991.
- The Czech immunologist-poet Miroslav Holub wrote "Kuru, or the Smiling Death Syndrome" about the disease.
- The X-Files season 7 episode "Theef" features a character diagnosed with advanced kuru after his sudden death. Research into kuru also influenced the script of the season 2 episode "Our Town."
- The video game Dead Island, as well as Dead Island: Riptide, cite kuru as the disease that has swept the fictional islands of Banoi and Palanai.
- In the film We Are What We Are, the medical examiner is able to identify the family as cannibals after he realizes that the family is suffering from kuru.
- In the video game DayZ, kuru is depicted as a gameplay mechanic where players who consume human meat develop uncontrollable laughter and tremors, reflecting the real-world disease.
- In the television show Scream Queens, character Dean Munsch suspects she has kuru.
- In the television show Watson, the team diagnoses a character, Wren, in Season 2, Episode 12, who suffers from kuru from eating her parents after a plane crash in the arctic.
