= Michael Alpers =

Australian medical researcher

Professor Michael Alpers AO CSM FRS FAA

John Curtin Distinguished Professor of International Health, Curtin University
- In office 2005–2016

Personal details
- Born: Michael Philip Alpers; 21 August 1934
- Died: 3 December 2024 (aged 90) Perth

Michael Philip Alpers (21 August 1934 - 3 December 2024) was an Australian medical researcher, former long-term Director of the PNG Institute of Medical Research and John Curtin distinguished Professor of International Health, at Curtin University. He died at the age of 90 on 3 December 2024 in Perth, WA.

== Education ==
Alpers graduated from University of Adelaide with a B.Sc. and M.B.B.S. (1961) and from University of Cambridge with an M.A.(1957)

== Career and research ==
After graduating, he commenced a career, ultimately resulting in investigating kuru, a transmissible spongiform encephalopathy.

- 1961–1963: Employed as a research officer for Kuru Research in Okapa by the Australian administration of the Territory of New Guinea's Department of Public Health .
- 1964-67: visiting scientist at NIH, Bethesda, Maryland 1964-67;
- 1968–1976: Employed as research fellow, Dept. of Microbiology, Univ. of Western Australia, Perth, where he continued his scientific expeditions and field studies in Papua New Guinea.
- 1977–2000: Director of the Papua New Guinea Institute of Medical Research (PNGIMR), leading the country's national health research organization.
- 2005-2016: John Curtin Distinguished Professor of International Health, Curtin University

He was an Honorary Senior Research Associate University College London.

Alpers and his work are the main theme of Kuru: The Science and the Sorcery (2010). He is interviewed in The Genius And The Boys (2009).
