= Fore people =

Ethnic group in Papua New Guinea

Fore
Total population
- approx. 20,000

Regions with significant populations
- Okapa District

Languages
- Fore

Religion
- Polytheism

The Fore people (/ˈfɔːreɪ/) are an ethnic group inhabiting Okapa District of the Eastern Highlands Province, Papua New Guinea. There are approximately 20,000 Fore who are separated by the Wanevinti Mountains into the North Fore and South Fore regions. Their main form of subsistence is slash-and-burn farming. The Fore language has three distinct dialects and is the southernmost member of the East Central Family, East New Guinea Highlands Stock, Trans–New Guinea phylum of Papuan languages.

In the 1950s, the neurological disease kuru was discovered in the South Fore. The local tradition of ritual cannibalism of their dead had led to an epidemic, with approximately 2,700 deaths between 1957 and 2005.

== History ==
Until the 1950s, the Fore people had minimal direct contact with outsiders who were, at the time, colonizing Papua New Guinea. A small number of prospectors crossed through their territory in the 1930s and at least one plane crashed there during World War II. New diseases such as influenza reached them before significant contact with colonial people occurred.

In the late 1940s, colonial government patrols reached further and further into Fore territory. The patrol officers, called kiaps by the Fore, tried to conduct a census in each village they passed through and lectured the villagers on the importance of hygiene and road construction. They encouraged the people to give up village warfare, traditional beliefs and cannibalism. These officers attempted to recruit local 'big men' to represent the colonial authorities as headmen (luluais) or as deputies (tultuls).

In 1951, a police post was set up at Okapa (then known as Moke) among the North Fore. A patrol officer, John R. McArthur, was stationed there from 1954 when the "rough track" from Kainantu opened to traffic. Transportation in the region improved to such a degree that it was possible to drive a Land Rover or motorbike to Purosa among the South Fore by 1957. At this time, colonial authorities estimated that there were at least 12,000 Fore living in the region.

In addition to government officers, other outsiders began to enter Fore territory. Anthropologists Ronald and Catherine Berndt spent time with the North Fore in 1953, while missionaries and traders penetrated further south. The Fore underwent considerable cultural change as a result of this contact: they traded with the outsiders, began growing coffee, and started to adopt a money-based economy. Gordon T. Linsley, a patrol officer stationed at Okapa, noted the rapid pace of social change among the Fore in a 1951 report. He observed that village warfare had declined considerably and that young Fore men were seemingly glad to have an excuse to quit fighting. The region was already under the control of the Australian government and some villages were relocating from the high ridges down to their gardens. Rest houses were present in the larger villages and separate men's houses remained only in the more isolated villages. Many people regularly used the rough track to travel to Kainantu and were able to see the latest fashions and hear Pidgin spoken, and broad paths linked communities together. However, Linsley noted that inter-district fighting persisted and accusations of sorcery were still common in Purosa.

== Geography ==
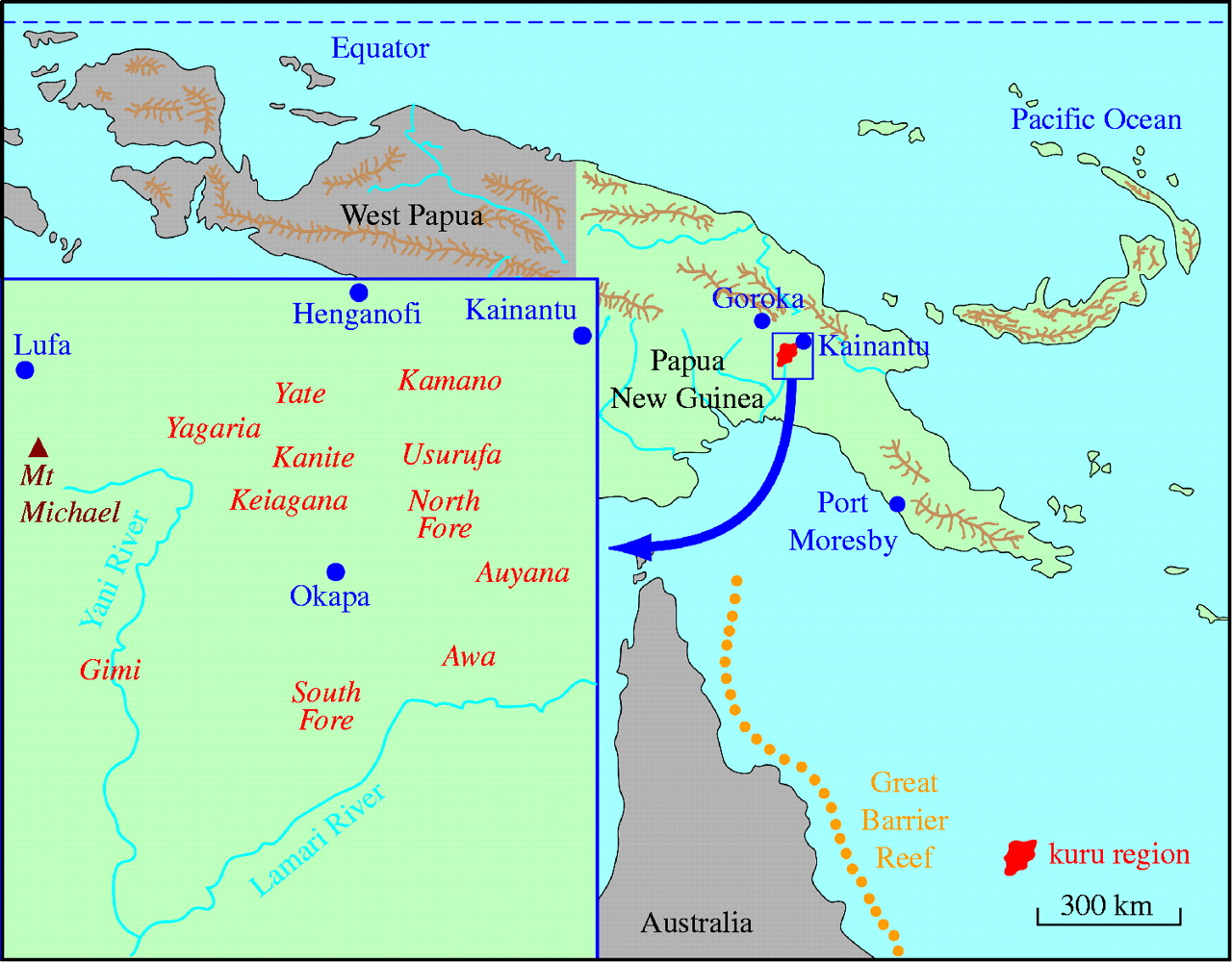
A map of Papua New Guinea and the Okapa District. The area highlighted in red consists primarily of the land inhabited by the Fore people.

The Fore people live in the Okapa District: a mountainous region in south-eastern Papua New Guinea. Combined, the 20,000 members of the North and South Fore live on approximately 400 square miles (1,000 km^{2}) of land, almost all of which is steep mountain. Of this area, the majority belongs to the region belonging to the South Fore, who also make up the majority of the population. In this mountainous region, there is an average of over 100 to 160 inches (2,500 to 4,100 mm) of rainfall per year, much of which falls in the rainy season, lasting from December to March.

Much of the landscape the Fore reside on is untouched forest. Areas of grassland or clearings in the forest appear only in locations of present or past agricultural cultivation. The settlements of the Fore people, usually consisting of a cluster of larger buildings, occur near tracts of land cleared for cultivation, and are frequently demolished and rebuilt elsewhere as new land is acquired for cultivation. These are almost exclusively on mountainsides, with the majority of Fore hamlets being established between 4,500 and 7,000 ft (1,400 and 2,100 m) above sea level, compared to the valleys which descend close to 1,000 ft (300 m) above sea level. The Lamari and Yani rivers are the two largest rivers in the Fore region. Both are tributaries to the larger Purari river to the south.

== Language ==
The Fore language is spoken in the Okapa District in the Eastern Highlands Province of Papua New Guinea. It is part of the East New Guinea Highlands Stock, and the Trans-New Guinea Phylum. It has three dialects: Northern (which is the prestige dialect), Central, and Southern.

== Societal structure ==
Fore society has no central political structure; leadership is undefined, and those who assume it do not hold formal power.

Fore society is traditionally organized into kinship groups, although these groups are not always strictly familial. A kinship group is made up of a male lineage, but may include other members, such as refugees or distant relatives, that migrated from other Fore kinship groups and became fully integrated into the group, taking on the same privileges and responsibilities as the biologically related members. Men from the same patriarchal lineage are not accorded any benefits over other non-related men in the group; in fact, it is considered beneficial and a strength to the village to bring in men from other kinship groups by offering them land to integrate them.

Generally, each kinship group lives in a village with several small offshoots, each consisting of a single house for the men and boys and several small surrounding houses for the women and children. These hamlets are established when gardening land surrounding the current settlement is exhausted and it is necessary to move outwards and clear more areas of woodland for growing crops. Each cluster of villages and hamlets consists of 50–400 people, with an average of 185.

Fore culture is heavily patrilineal: for example, land is passed down through the male lineage, and boys marry and remain on the land on which their fathers lived. Daughters of one clan typically marry into many different clans, but these marriage alliances often do not last long. Conflict often arises over unused land for expansion of farming and grazing, and villages or kinship groups will often band together to defend territory. Generally, these battles are fought with bows and arrows as the primary weapon. Settlements are temporary; a group will flee when they lose a battle over their land and will take refuge with other groups of friends or relatives.

Males born at the same time or in the same childbirth hut are considered agemates, or nagaiya. Throughout his lifetime, a man's nagaiya remains a significant part of his life; for example, agemates will hunt and battle together. The ties among nagaiya are considered as strong as family ties.

=== Nagaiya ===
Nagaiya, or age mates, are individuals bonded together for life in a manner similar to siblings, though they are not necessarily blood relations. Two individuals can become nagaiya if they are born at the same time or if their mothers are isolated in the birthing hut at the same time. Boys have a second opportunity to become nagaiya if they go through the manhood initiation ceremony together. This ceremony consists of living isolated in the forest for a month, receiving a new name, getting piercings, and playing music with sacred flutes. Women can become nagaiya, but it is not as important for them as it is for men.

Nagaiyas help each other through difficult and dangerous times, such as hunting in dangerous forests. During times of war, they are expected to help by giving food and lodging. Sometimes, if there is a conflict between a husband and his wife, the nagaiya will help resolve it. The husband and his nagaiya will slather themselves in mud and ash (symbols of mourning), hit the wife, and consume one of her pigs and one of her sweet potato gardens. To express her displeasure at her husband's actions, the wife will hold a banquet with the women in the clan near her husband's meal. Later, after the wife gives her husband a small reparation, the conflict between them will be resolved.

Nagaiyas provide support when normal kinsmen would not be able to. For example, when a man consummates his marriage, he does not tell his kinsmen as to do so would be shameful, admitting that he is contaminated from sexual contact with a woman. However, he can freely tell his nagaiya without shame, as his nagaiya are obligated to share the burden with him. Additionally, when his wife first menstruates, a man stops eating pork, rats, possums, and spinach-like vegetables until his wife gives birth to his first child, in order to protect himself, as menstruation is thought to be dangerous to men. Nagaiyas share these diet restrictions in order to show their support.

When a man dies, his nagaiya are obligated to attend his funeral where his family will give them anonkaiyambu or "head pay". The nagaiya are then duty bound to avenge the death of their age mate. Thus, elderly men whose nagaiya are all dead fear that they will be killed by an enemy sorcerer, as there is no one left to avenge them. After a man's death, his nagaiya and brothers become potential husbands for the widowed wife, although the wife decides who she will marry. This creates stress on the relationship between a wife and her husband's nagaiya, as the nagaiyas are both friends and potential husbands.

The bond between nagaiya is extremely close. Sometimes younger men jokingly use the term nagaiya to describe elders with which they have a very close bond. Due to this bond, it is a sin punishable by death to abandon or betray one's nagaiya.

== Culture ==
=== Diet ===
The Fore diet consists of pigs, small animals, insects, wild plants, and root vegetables such as taro. Root vegetables are cultivated on land cleared by slash-and-burn farming. After the introduction of the sweet potato roughly 150 years ago, food production increased, as the crop could be grown in harsher conditions than existing root vegetables. Around the same time, the Fore began domesticating pigs, replacing the need to hunt wild ones. The sweet potato not only became a staple food, but was used as feed for domesticated pigs.

In their analysis of a 1957 study, Hamilton-Reid and Gajdusek determined that the Fore people have an unusually rich and varied diet, especially when compared to other civilizations in the New Guinea highland regions. In addition to growing sweet potato, ebia, sugarcane, and pitpit in their large and productive gardens, the Fore supplement their diet with pigs, rodents, and adult insects. The quality of their diet is so high that, in the 1957 study, no evidence of clinical malnutrition was found in the general population despite lacking access to any modern nutritional or medical services.

=== Precolonial marriage ===
A Fore girl becomes eligible for marriage when she first menstruates. When she marries, she leaves her home to go live with her husband. If her husband is in a different clan, then she must leave all her family and old friends behind, including any nagaiya. During a marriage ceremony, the husband's family pays the bride's family a marriage fee. This money is thrown on the bride's head as "head pay". Then, the husband and bride attend separate feasts. The groom is often pierced in the nose, as piercings are thought to increase a man's strength.

=== Religion ===
According to traditional Fore beliefs, the land they live in (or bagina) is alive, and it created the world. The bagina also created the ancestor guardians, amani, from which the Fore are descended. The Fore believe a person has five souls: the auma (good qualities), the ama (simulacra of the auma that has magical powers), the aona (special abilities), the yesegi (ancestral power or aggression), and the kwela (dangerous ghost or pollution). When a person dies, the Fore conduct mortuary rituals to ensure that each soul reaches its proper destination. Upon death, the auma travels to kwelanandamundi, the land of the dead. To help the auma reach kwelanandamundi, the deceased's family members leave food with the body. Two to three days after death, the body may be buried, entombed, or, historically, cooked and consumed. If consumed, the deceased's ama was thought to bless those who ate the body. The aona passed on to the deceased's preferred child, while the yesegi passed on to all the deceased's children. Purification rituals during and after consumption of the body aimed to ensure that the kwela does not taint those who eat it. Through such rituals, the Fore were assured that the deceased's positive aspects remain in the tribe, while the auma, ama, and kwela reach kwelanandamundi.

==== Nokoti ====
Nokoti is a forest spirit common in Fore folklore. Originally, Nokoti was portrayed as a tall masculine man carrying a small axe or small bag that contains his magical power. They lived in an isolated mysterious part of the forest, such as an unusual rock formation or misshaped tree. The area in which Nokoti lived (Tok Pisin: ples masalai or sacred place) was considered sacred and should not be disturbed. Any person that intruded would be afflicted with illnesses caused by the Nokoti kionei, or Nokoti's poison. For example, if a family with a child slept overnight in the ples masalai, Nokoti would steal and hide a lock of the child's hair. If the hair was not found, then the child would die from illness. Adults would not die, but their genitalia would become inflamed.

Nokoti were not always harmful, and might bless individuals with superior hunting skills or increased fertility. One common tale of this benevolence recounts the life of a hunter who discovers a unique rock formation while hunting. He climbs to the top and finds a Nokoti named Walusubo, sitting on sugar cane leaves. The man asks for Walusubo's bag. Walusubo agrees to give him the bag in the future and tells him to eat the sugar leaves in the meantime. He then gives the hunter instructions that vastly improve his hunting abilities. After the hunter dies, his kin return to the rock, but Walusubo has died with the hunter, as they were nagaiya. Although the magic bag vanished with the Nokoti, the kin gain the strength to vanquish many foes when they eat the sugar leaves on that rock formation. Since then, the rock formation was known as Walusubo Yaba or Walusubo's stone.

The flag of the Eastern Highlands. A nokoti is displayed in the center of the gold star. The nokoti may also be referred to as Nokondi.

When Papua New Guinea was colonized, Nokoti changed to become less of a benefactor and more of a criminal. The appearance of Nokoti became lankier, sometimes maimed if he was injured during his earlier crimes. This change in Nokoti folklore reflects the shift from the indigenous hunting culture to the capitalist culture of the colonies. One of these new tales tells of a Nokoti entering a village and stealing a woman's skirt, shells and beads. He then returns to the forest where he dresses a tree with his stolen clothes. A hunter spots him and returns to the village to collect the other men, but when they return to capture the thief, the Nokoti is not there and the stolen traditional valuables cannot be reclaimed. Another tale describes a Nokoti who was captured and sent to Australia while robbing a local store. Other tales tell of the Nokoti stealing the money that a kiap (a patrol officer) was using to pay his employees, or attacking huts and members of the patrol.

In modern days, the Nokoti is part of the Fore cultural heritage. The government of the Eastern Highlands declared the Nokoti a symbol of unity in 1997 and gave it a prominent position in the center of the Eastern Highlands' flag. The Nokoti is now viewed as a mischievous benefactor.

==== Sorcery ====
Another notable aspect of the traditional Fore belief system is a belief in sorcery. The Fore view sorcery as a chaotic force that works to uproot the status quo, though not necessarily as an instrument of evil. It is seen as a source of power and wealth and a valid way to defend against other kinship groups. Battles and migrations among the Fore have often been caused by accusations of sorcery. Problems within a kinship group may be blamed on sorcery, although there is a dichotomy between the North and South Fore in this belief. The North Fore tend to fear attacks from other villages or kinship groups, while among the South Fore the fear is more of sorcery attacks from within family groups, possibly due to bribes given to sorcerers by enemy groups. To protect against attacks by enemy villages, the Fore make an effort to keep outside sorcerers from being able to access leavings or water holes.

Sorcerers within a kinship group were originally seen as defenders of the village, but the kuru epidemic caused this view to shift. Sorcery attacks by insiders were thought to be the cause of the disease. This led to community meetings at which the unknown sorcerers were begged to cease the attacks.

Many Fore people converted to Christianity after contact with missionaries from 1957 onwards, and have denied the efficacy of sorcery.

== Military and warfare ==
Prior to contact with colonial forces and patrols, the Fore people often engaged in warfare amongst themselves. This warfare occurred between local Fore tribes, usually started by one tribe as a means of retribution or as a preemptive measure to strategically consolidate power in the region. Often, tribes created alliances with other tribes and were expected to aid their allies in the war effort with food, prayer, and troops. Warfare amongst the Fore led either directly or indirectly to the mortality of approximately 0.6% of the population, most of whom were younger males.

Despite being consistently engaged in warfare, the Fore were characterized by their tempered disdain for warfare and preference for peace. The Fore predominantly viewed warfare as an undesirable last resort, so they often resolved conflicts peacefully or ended wars at the earliest feasible opportunity.

=== Cause ===
Warfare amongst the Fore people was almost exclusively initiated by the larger, more powerful Fore clans, such as the Mugayamuti and Ketabe clans. War was predominantly a means of retaliation over perceived slights or a preemptive measure to ensure dominance in the region. Even wars that began under the guise of retaliation were sometimes strategic in nature; larger clans would call for warfare against smaller groups if they were in desirable trade locations, or in order to increase their might and military numbers. One such example is a war that occurred between the Weneru group in the Wanitabe clan, which had allied itself with the Mugayamuti. After word spread that the Weneru had harvested a large amount of taro, a vegetable commonly grown in the region, the Ketabe ambushed them under the guise of sorcery allegations in order to take this harvest. The Ketabe had been afraid that, with the excess of harvest, the Mugayamuti would be able to extend their alliances and thus consolidate more power in the region.

Warfare also was commonly initiated as a result of suspicions of acts of sorcery or theft committed by other groups. Physical markings of a sorcery attack included skin damage, swelling, psychotic behavior, and fainting. If a member of a tribe fell ill and displayed these symptoms, then sorcery was typically suspected. Clans, by default, typically presumed innocence for their own members. Thus, suspects of sorcery and theft were normally members of rival clans.

Since the Fore did not have established mechanisms for jurisprudence, guilt was often determined through the use of rituals. One such ritual was placing hunted animals in bamboo vessels, each vessel representing the name of an accused person or tribe responsible. These vessels would then be put over a fire. After some time upon the fire, the animals would be removed and their livers would then be extracted. A fully cooked liver was considered proof of innocence and, conversely, an uncooked or partially cooked liver was considered conclusive evidence of guilt for the person or group associated with the vessel that contained the incriminating animal.

=== Methods ===
The Fore had not been exposed to firearms and other advanced weaponry prior to colonial contact and thus resorted to archery-based warfare in the form of open-field fighting and ambushes. War was typically initiated after one group who, upon determining that war was necessary against another group, executed a secret raid on the enemy. These raids were normally performed by a small group of skilled warriors, targeting enemy homes, civilians, and gardens. After being attacked, groups typically rounded up the able-bodied men amongst them and met the initiating group in the open field for battle. Coordination of war location and logistics was typically done through messengers carried by pako, peaceful envoys who went to enemy territory alone and unarmed. Pako were typically respected older men or women who were visibly incapable of fighting. Often, pako had some sort of tie to both groups, and kept tallies of the deaths on both sides. Although the Fore did not have formal written agreements to grant immunity to pako messengers, Fore tribes generally respected them and granted them safe passage in and out of their territories.

In open-field battles, quarreling sides met on either side of the field, generally after sunrise. Intimidation tactics such as profuse chanting, singing, dancing, sudden advancements, and yelling profane insults were commonly used. The standard battle formation of a group normally had a defensive front line of men carrying wooden shields to protect themselves and their fellow men from falling arrows. Behind them were men armed with bows and arrows. Shots would be fired sporadically, as arrows were not made in abundance due to the lack of mass production techniques in Fore society. As a result of this, and the capability of fighters to dodge or block incoming arrows, deaths were minimal though common in these battles. In the rare occasion that more than a few people died in one battle, the tribe that suffered those deaths would commonly avenge them with ambush attacks on enemy villages. In the afternoon, fighting normally ended, to be continued after the following sunrise. Fore wars were relatively short, lasting anywhere from a few months to 2–3 years.

=== Peacemaking ===
Even prior to colonial contact, the Fore had established rituals for peacemaking between groups that were either at war or in tense relations. These rituals were typically initiated after a pako brokered an agreement of peace between the hostile forces, based on the damages exacted by both groups. Pigs were used as remuneration for fatalities, damaged crops, and damaged property. After peace terms were mutually agreed upon, the now-allied groups would hold a ceremony of peace at the battlefield upon which they had fought. At the ceremony, an elderly woman from both sides would place the leaves of a daka plant and some sugarcane at the center of the battlefield as gifts for the other group. These plants symbolized calm, coolness, and healing in Fore culture, and thus were often used to indicate times of rejoice and peace. After the plants were placed, an elderly man from both groups would go to the center and chew on the sugarcane, symbolizing acceptance for the gifts. After this, singing and cheering would often ensue. Speeches lauding the warriors of both sides and flattering the new allies were commonly delivered by both sides as well.

Fore clans also placed significant emphasis on keeping strong relations with allied clans, often inviting them to extravagant pork feasts. This, in part, led to durable alliances between some clans and helped keep the peace once the fighting had ceased.

=== Colonial influence on warfare ===
After contact with Australian colonial forces in the late 1940s and early 1950s, violence between clans abruptly came to an end. Colonial forces brought a centralized, overarching power to the Fore region, establishing judicial systems and winning the Fore's respect and cooperation - a fact that contributed to the power that colonial forces could wield as opposed to a respect for the abstract concept of colonial laws. Colonial forces and patrol officers also brought new goods to the region, which the Fore called mono'ana and valued greatly. The decreased competition over resources and power in the region led to the relative dissolution of rivalries. Quarrels were typically resolved by the luluai, respected natives who were chartered by Australian forces to be local representatives of the Australian government. Australian patrol forces, called kiaps, also helped keep the peace by enforcing punishments on aggressors. The Australian Colonial Administration referred to this project of ending violence and establishing control in the Fore region as the "pacification project." They established the Court of Native Affairs, which featured both native and Australian representatives responsible for the resolution of civil disputes amongst the Fore.

At first, the Fore distrusted and feared the colonial forces. Rituals were performed as a precaution after coming into contact with colonial forces, for fear that they may be evil spirits. However, as time went on, it became a position of social privilege for the Fore to be associated with patrol officers and colonials. Despite this, there are many accounts of natives who were treated poorly by patrol officers. Fore assistants were often overworked and under-compensated, and were sometimes subject to verbal attacks by patrol officers. Despite these transgressions, disagreements between patrol officers and natives were sporadic.

The mixture of Australian hegemony in the region, a centralized governance, an established court, incoming wealth, and the already present desire of the Fore to stop warfare led to a lasting peace in the region.

== Foreign influence on Fore culture ==
Foreign influence brought much change to the culture of the Fore, both directly and indirectly. Throughout the 1950s, 1960s, and 1970s, foreign presence in the Fore region was common. Along with Australian colonial forces, scientists studying local diseases and Christian missionaries frequented the region.

The native religion of the Fore was slowly replaced with Christianity, due to the establishment of missions and influence of missionaries. This change is partially responsible for the halting of the Fore ritual of consuming deceased relatives, which was a primary agent in the rise of the kuru disease. Furthermore, the rigidity of clans and clan alliances began to dissolve, due to the halting of warfare and abundance of resources. Men and women began to mix more freely, as did people of different clans. Trade networks were vastly expanded due to the introduction of roads and more advanced transportation technology. Foreign crops and technology, such as coffee beans and steel tools, were embraced by Fore society. Additionally, foreign influence and resources led to the establishment of clinics in the region, which helped decrease Fore mortality rates and bring modern health practices to the Fore.

== Kuru among the South Fore ==
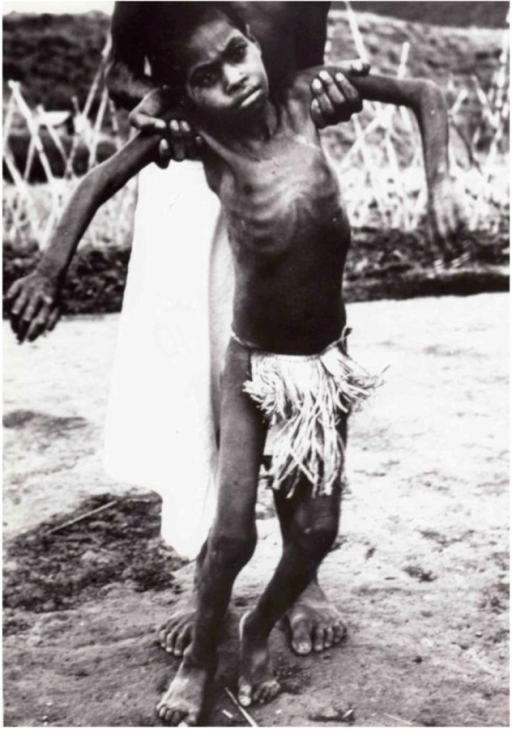
Fore child in advanced stage of kuru, who cannot sit or stand without help

Kuru is a rare, orally transmitted, incurable neurodegenerative disorder caused by prions. The disease reached its peak prevalence in the 1950s and 1960s. It is characterized by a loss of coordination and control over muscle movement that ultimately leads to death.

Kuru is first attested around the turn of the 20th century in the Uwami village of the Keiagana people, and spread to the Awande in the North Fore. By the 1930s, it had spread to the South Fore. It was around this time that Ted Eubank, a European gold prospector, first noticed the neurodegenerative disease. It was first documented in 1957, by anthropologists Berndt and Berndt, and reported to the Western medical world, in the same year, by D.C. Gadjusek and Vincent Zigas. According to Gajdusek, who observed kuru in the 1950s, the hypothesis that the disease was spread via the endocannibalistic rituals of the Fore people was extremely likely. However, Shirley Lindenbaum and Robert Glasse were the first to formally publish the hypothesis that kuru spread through cannibalism.

Women and children would most often consume the brains of the deceased, which were the most likely body part to contain the infectious prion agents, while the men preferentially consumed muscle tissue. As a result, the vast majority of victims among the South Fore were women. In fact, eight times more women than men contracted the disease. It later affected small children and the elderly at a high rate as well.

The incidence of kuru increased in the 1940s and 1950s and the mortality rate began to approach close to 35/1,000 in a population of 12,000 Fore people. This distorted the female:male ratio, which reached 1:2, or even 1:3 among South Fore. Kuru has been considered eradicated since 2005 and the last confirmed death was in 2009.

Though the Fore people also dispose of their dead in other ways, the most common method up to the 1960s was transumption, or consumption of their dead. Transumption not only expressed love and grief, but also recycled the deceased's abilities within the family and quarantined the kwela, which was dangerous if not disposed of properly. It was believed that women's wombs were best for containing the kwela.

When an individual died, after grieving for two to three days, the Fore women cut up, divided, shared, and consumed the body. The men rarely partook in the dismemberment and consumption of the corpse. They took great care to consume all parts, even drying and crushing the bones and all used cooking utensils and mixing it in with vegetables so that nothing was missed. A series of purification rituals meant to cleanse the body of kwela then took place over several weeks. Finally, there were feasts and rituals that simultaneously compensated the women for housing the kwela, acted as the final step in cleansing the body of kwela, and sent all remaining parts of the soul to the land of the dead.

This practice of transumption amplified the spread of kuru within Fore communities. Following the outbreak, the Australian government forbade and rigorously controlled the practice, and transumption ceased almost immediately in most Fore areas, although it continued surreptitiously among the South Fore for some time. It is now widely believed that kuru transmission through transumption had ceased by the 1960s, though it continued longer in the south than in the north.

Fore women consumed the brain more than men and children did. Because of this and their primary role in transumption, they had a much higher mortality rate of kuru than men, which spurred a demographic emergency. Men took on the roles and duties of the mother in addition to that of the father, healers were consulted and pilgrimages organized, bride prices were withheld until the bride produced a child, and many feared extinction. The Fore people believe that ailments and misfortunes stem from sorcery and witchcraft, and so scrambled to find the sorcerers responsible for kuru. Today, they no longer uniformly attribute kuru to witchcraft and may speak of it as a disease. However, they have not uniformly adopted modern medicine or abandoned their belief in sorcery either.

=== Influence of kuru and other diseases ===
Kuru and other diseases, such as dysentery and whooping cough, had a significant influence on Fore culture. Often, these diseases represented the physical manifestations of sorcery to the Fore people, which contributed to warfare and the development of religious rituals against sorcery. Furthermore, kuru predominantly affected women, as women more commonly partook in cannibalistic religious rituals. Because of this, there was a significant sex imbalance in Fore society. By some accounts, this gender imbalance reached a 3:1 male to female ratio at its worst. This affected the family structure of the Fore, as it became commonplace for children to be raised and cared for only by their fathers.

Additionally, some accredit the continued foreign interest in the Fore to the scientific phenomenon that was the kuru disease. The consistent presence of scientists and medical professionals to study kuru was one of the reasons foreign infrastructure, technology, and cultural practices was able to disperse through the region as quickly as it did, supercharging the speed of cultural change in the region.

== See also ==
- Kuru
- Papua New Guinea
- Cannibalism
