= Melanie White =

American jewelry designer

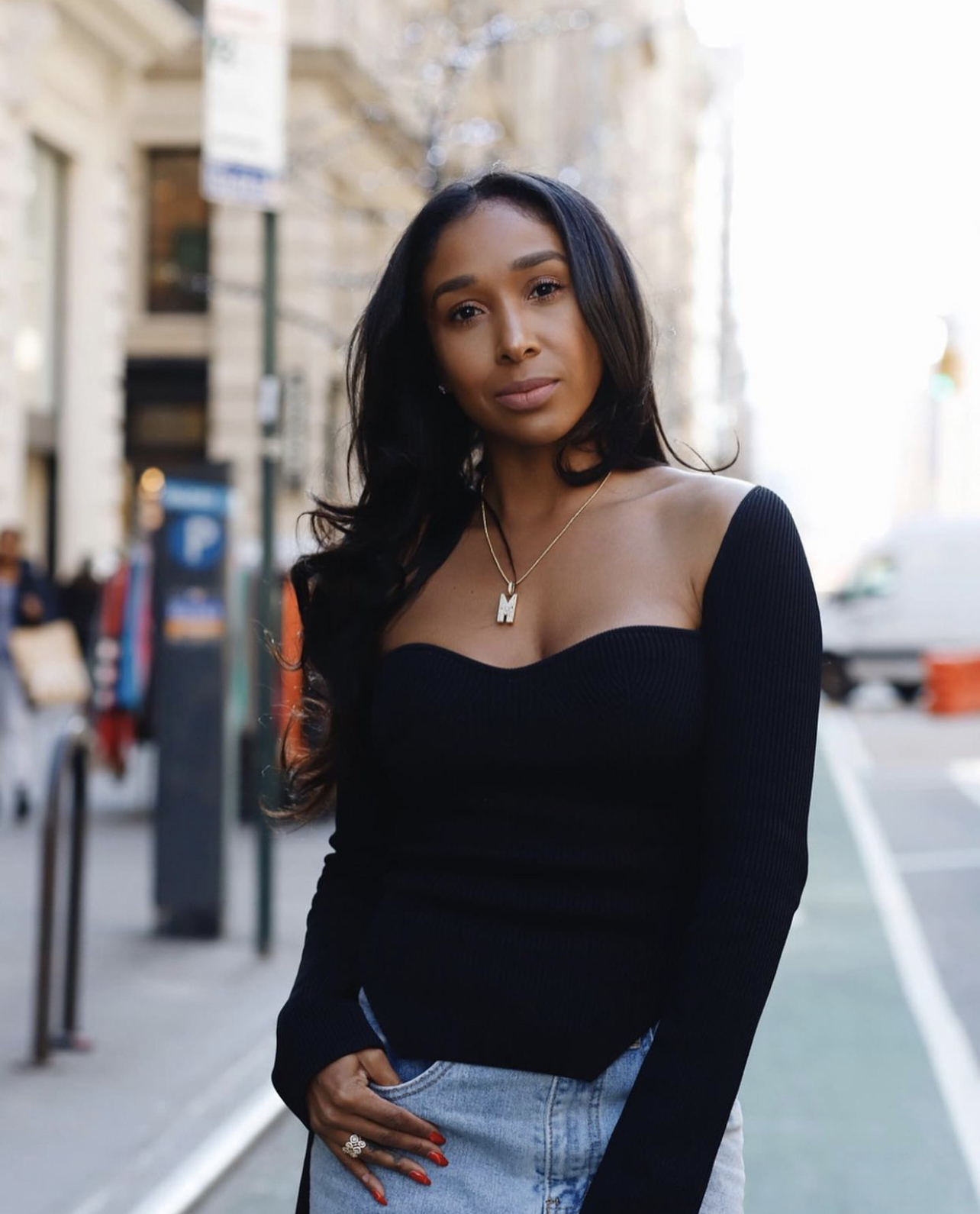
- Melanie White in 2019
- Occupation: Jewelry designer

Melanie White is an American designer from New York, NY.

== Career ==
In 2009, she started her own accessories company named MELANIE MARiE. In 2010, she opened a boutique in Philadelphia on Temple's Campus called Greek & Life Boutique. Melanie is known best for her work with MELANIE MARiE. It can be seen on dozens of celebrities and featured in numerous publications. She creates custom gold items for the biggest names and has collaborated with celebrities such as Beyonce, Ty Hunter, Adrienne Bailon and many more. She also known for her line of fashionable wearable technology items in which she has partnered with Metawear to create fashion forward technology pieces which will help people in everyday living. Melanie was listed as the "Black Designer to Know" on Ebony. Cosmopolitan magazine listed Melanie's line in their Christmas gift guide on what to buy for the holidays.

== Filmography (including music videos & television shows) ==
Year	Title	Role	Ref
2005	I Need Dubs Starring Master P and Romeo Miller	Featured	
2014	Love & Hip Hop Atlanta	MM Featured	
2015	Lil Mama Sausage Music Video	MM Featured	
