= Patricia Vaccarino =

American writer

- Born: Yonkers, New York, United States
- Education: B.A. English and Political Science; University of Rhode Island, University of Puget Sound School of Law
- Occupation: Writer
- Writing career
- Years active: 2009–present
- Genres: fiction, non-fiction
- Website: patriciavaccarino.com

Patricia Vaccarino is an American writer. She has published four novels as well as three nonfiction books based on her experience in public relations.

== Career ==
Vaccarino graduated from the University of Rhode Island, and also has advanced education from the University of Puget Sound School of Law (now Seattle University School of Law).

Vaccarino founded the media company PR for People®, which spun off from Xanthus Communications in 2010. She continues to maintain PR for People as a pro-bono enterprise.

Vaccarino's nonfiction work, The Death of a Library: An American Tragedy, is about the circumstances that led to the demolition of the Yonkers Carnegie Library in 1982.

The first book in the Yonkers trilogy, YONKERS Yonkers!: A Story of Race and Redemption, explores the racial past of Yonkers, the Vietnam War, the Woodstock Music Festival, and drug use endemic to Yonkers youth in 1970. The second book in the Yonkers trilogy, The Heart of Yonkers, tackles coming of age pangs.

The third book in the Yonkers trilogy, So Not Yonkers, wrestles with the classism, racism and sexism that is baked into American society. So Not Yonkers is realistic fiction about the working class that examines a grim reality—the world is rigged against everyone who is either poor or from the working class.

Her book Steps: My not-so-secret life as an adult dancer and how it impacts my life and business was inspired by learning ballet.

She has written essays to demystify the process of how the news gets made, which ultimately led to the publication of her book American Spin. This nonfiction work examines the history of spin from Julius Caesar, the young Caesar Augustus, and Queen Elizabeth I of England to present day media stars like Kim Kardashian, Lee Radziwill, and the public intellectual Bernard-Henri Lévy.

Her essay When the Bronx Looks Like Paris drew criticism from Bronx community activists, including Bronx public officials, who claimed she was depicting a negative portrayal of the Bronx.

== Bibliography ==
=== Novels ===
- One Small Murder (2010)
- YONKERS Yonkers!: A story of race and redemption (2018)
- The Heart of Yonkers (April 2020)
- So Not Yonkers (April 2023)

=== Non-fiction ===
- PR for People (2009)
- Steps: My not-so-secret life as an adult dancer and how it impacts my life and business (2012)
- American Spin (2015)
- The Death of a Library: An American Tragedy (2020)
