= List of Atrichopogon species =

List of biting midges in the genus Atrichopogon

Atrichopogon is a genus of biting midges, small flies in the family Ceratopogonidae. As of 2023, 531 species are accepted within Atrichopogon.

== A ==
- Atrichopogon abrasus
- Atrichopogon abyssiniae
- Atrichopogon acanthocolpus
- Atrichopogon acosmetus
- Atrichopogon adamsoni
- Atrichopogon aereum
- Atrichopogon aethiops
- Atrichopogon africanus
- Atrichopogon akizukii
- Atrichopogon alainus
- Atrichopogon albinensis
- Atrichopogon albiscapula
- Atrichopogon alticola
- Atrichopogon altivolans
- Atrichopogon alveolatus
- Atrichopogon anemotis
- Atrichopogon annulifemoratus
- Atrichopogon appendiculatus
- Atrichopogon aquilonarius
- Atrichopogon archboldi
- Atrichopogon arciforceps
- Atrichopogon arcticus
- Atrichopogon argus
- Atrichopogon argutus
- Atrichopogon aridus
- Atrichopogon armaticaudalis
- Atrichopogon armatilabrum
- Atrichopogon arti
- Atrichopogon assuetus
- Atrichopogon asuturus
- Atrichopogon aterrimus
- Atrichopogon atratus
- Atrichopogon atribarba
- Atrichopogon atricollis
- Atrichopogon atriscapula
- Atrichopogon atromaculatus
- Atrichopogon atroscutellatus
- Atrichopogon atroxipes
- Atrichopogon attentus
- Atrichopogon auricoma
- Atrichopogon australis

== B ==
- Atrichopogon badiensis
- Atrichopogon bai
- Atrichopogon bakeri
- Atrichopogon balseiroi
- Atrichopogon bangqiensis
- Atrichopogon barbatus
- Atrichopogon bargaensis
- Atrichopogon baripenis
- Atrichopogon beccus
- Atrichopogon bellicosus
- Atrichopogon bessa
- Atrichopogon biangulus
- Atrichopogon bicolor
- Atrichopogon bicuspis
- Atrichopogon bidaculus
- Atrichopogon bifasciatus
- Atrichopogon bifidus
- Atrichopogon binipenis
- Atrichopogon biroi
- Atrichopogon bisetosus
- Atrichopogon boharti
- Atrichopogon borkenti
- Atrichopogon brasiliensis
- Atrichopogon brevicellula
- Atrichopogon brevicercus
- Atrichopogon brevicornis
- Atrichopogon brevifurca
- Atrichopogon brevipalpalis
- Atrichopogon brevipalpis
- Atrichopogon brevipenis
- Atrichopogon breviserra
- Atrichopogon brevistilus
- Atrichopogon briani
- †Atrichopogon brunnescens
- Atrichopogon brunnicellula
- Atrichopogon brunnipes
- Atrichopogon bulla

== C ==
- Atrichopogon calcuttensis
- Atrichopogon callipotami
- Atrichopogon capistratus
- Atrichopogon caribbeanus
- Atrichopogon carinatus
- Atrichopogon carnatus
- Atrichopogon carpinteroi
- Atrichopogon casali
- Atrichopogon catinus
- Atrichopogon celibatus
- Atrichopogon celsus
- Atrichopogon characapodus
- Atrichopogon chazeaui
- Atrichopogon chilensis
- Atrichopogon chrysosphaerotus
- Atrichopogon chuanxiensis
- Atrichopogon circatheca
- Atrichopogon clarusaliger
- Atrichopogon clastrieri
- Atrichopogon clavator
- Atrichopogon clavifuscus
- Atrichopogon colossus
- Atrichopogon columbianus
- Atrichopogon comatus
- Atrichopogon comechingon
- Atrichopogon conglomeratus
- Atrichopogon conspicuus
- Atrichopogon coracinus
- Atrichopogon corpulentus
- Atrichopogon costalis
- Atrichopogon costaricae
- Atrichopogon costatus
- Atrichopogon cretensis
- Atrichopogon crinitus
- Atrichopogon crispantis
- Atrichopogon cristatus
- Atrichopogon cryptogamus
- Atrichopogon curtipalpis

== D ==
- Atrichopogon daleyae
- Atrichopogon dehiscentis
- Atrichopogon dekeyseri
- Atrichopogon delpontei
- Atrichopogon densipluma
- Atrichopogon depilis
- Atrichopogon deyrupi
- Atrichopogon diandrous
- Atrichopogon didymothecae
- Atrichopogon diluta
- Atrichopogon discors
- Atrichopogon distinctus
- †Atrichopogon dominicanus
- Atrichopogon domizii
- Atrichopogon dorsalis
- Atrichopogon downesi
- Atrichopogon dubius

== E ==
- Atrichopogon echinatus
- Atrichopogon echinodes
- Atrichopogon edentatus
- Atrichopogon edwardsi
- Atrichopogon elektrophaeus
- Atrichopogon endemicus
- †Atrichopogon eocenicus
- Atrichopogon epicautae
- Atrichopogon epixanthopygus
- Atrichopogon eucnemus
- Atrichopogon exiletergitus
- Atrichopogon eximiunguis
- Atrichopogon ezoensis

== F ==
- Atrichopogon falcatus
- Atrichopogon falcis
- Atrichopogon farri
- Atrichopogon femoralis
- Atrichopogon fenestriscutum
- Atrichopogon ferenudus
- Atrichopogon fiebrigi
- Atrichopogon fimbriatus
- Atrichopogon fitzroyi
- Atrichopogon flabellis
- Atrichopogon flavenicruris
- Atrichopogon flavens
- Atrichopogon flaveolus
- Atrichopogon flavicaudae
- Atrichopogon flaviceps
- Atrichopogon flavidus
- Atrichopogon flavipalpis
- Atrichopogon flavipes
- Atrichopogon flavipluma
- Atrichopogon flaviscapus
- Atrichopogon flaviscutellum
- Atrichopogon flavitarsatus
- Atrichopogon flavitergum
- Atrichopogon flavolineatus
- Atrichopogon flavus
- Atrichopogon flumineus
- Atrichopogon forcipatus
- Atrichopogon fulvipes
- Atrichopogon fulviscutellaris
- Atrichopogon fulvus
- Atrichopogon fusciscutellum
- Atrichopogon fusculus
- Atrichopogon fuscus
- Atrichopogon fusinervis

== G ==
- Atrichopogon gamboai
- Atrichopogon geminus
- Atrichopogon ghashmi
- Atrichopogon gillipaludosus
- Atrichopogon gilvus
- Atrichopogon glaber
- Atrichopogon glabricollis
- Atrichopogon globosus
- Atrichopogon globulifer
- Atrichopogon glukhovae
- Atrichopogon gordoni
- Atrichopogon gracilis
- Atrichopogon grandis
- Atrichopogon granditergitus
- Atrichopogon granditibialis
- Atrichopogon gressitti
- Atrichopogon greyi
- Atrichopogon griseolus
- Atrichopogon guianensis
- Atrichopogon guttatus

== H ==
- Atrichopogon haemorrhoidalis
- Atrichopogon haesitans
- Atrichopogon harpagonum
- Atrichopogon harrisi
- Atrichopogon helles
- Atrichopogon hesperius
- Atrichopogon hexastichus
- Atrichopogon hilaris
- Atrichopogon hirsutipennis
- Atrichopogon hirtidorsum
- Atrichopogon hispaniae
- Atrichopogon hobsoni
- Atrichopogon homofacies
- Atrichopogon homoius
- Atrichopogon horni
- Atrichopogon horos
- Atrichopogon hortensis
- Atrichopogon hukengicus
- Atrichopogon humicola
- Atrichopogon hystricoides

== I ==
- Atrichopogon ilonae
- Atrichopogon impensus
- Atrichopogon inacayali
- Atrichopogon inconspicuus
- Atrichopogon incultus
- Atrichopogon indianus
- Atrichopogon infamis
- Atrichopogon infuscus
- Atrichopogon insignipalpis
- Atrichopogon insigniunguis
- Atrichopogon insigniventris
- Atrichopogon insolens
- Atrichopogon insolitipes
- Atrichopogon insularis
- Atrichopogon intertextus
- Atrichopogon isis
- Atrichopogon isolatus

== J ==
- Atrichopogon jacobsoni
- Atrichopogon jamnbacki
- Atrichopogon japonicus
- Atrichopogon javieri
- Atrichopogon jejunus
- Atrichopogon jianfengensis
- Atrichopogon jubacaudalis

== K ==
- Atrichopogon kagiensis
- Atrichopogon kangnani
- Atrichopogon kelainosoma
- Atrichopogon kribiensis
- Atrichopogon kyotoensis

== L ==
- Atrichopogon lacajae
- Atrichopogon lacustris
- Atrichopogon ladislavi
- Atrichopogon lamellamarsipos
- Atrichopogon lampronotus
- Atrichopogon largipenis
- Atrichopogon lassus
- Atrichopogon latipygus
- Atrichopogon lazoensis
- Atrichopogon levis
- Atrichopogon lindneri
- Atrichopogon lituratus
- Atrichopogon lobatus
- Atrichopogon longicalcar
- Atrichopogon longicalcaris
- Atrichopogon longicornis
- Atrichopogon longicosta
- Atrichopogon longipalpis
- Atrichopogon longirostris
- Atrichopogon longiserra
- Atrichopogon longitergitus
- Atrichopogon lucorum
- Atrichopogon ludingensis
- Atrichopogon luteicollis
- Atrichopogon luteipes
- Atrichopogon lutescens
- Atrichopogon lyratus

== M ==
- Atrichopogon macrodentatum
- Atrichopogon maculatus
- Atrichopogon maculipennis
- Atrichopogon maculosus
- Atrichopogon magnus
- Atrichopogon marginipilus
- Atrichopogon maritimus
- Atrichopogon mastersi
- Atrichopogon matilei
- Atrichopogon medicrinis
- Atrichopogon megalotheca
- Atrichopogon melancholicus
- Atrichopogon melanimus
- Atrichopogon melanoticus
- Atrichopogon melinois
- Atrichopogon meloesugans
- Atrichopogon mendozae
- Atrichopogon mexicanus
- Atrichopogon minimus
- Atrichopogon minutalatus
- Atrichopogon minutus
- Atrichopogon miripalpis
- Atrichopogon modestus
- Atrichopogon monomorphicus
- Atrichopogon monticola
- Atrichopogon montigenum
- Atrichopogon montium
- Atrichopogon montivagus
- Atrichopogon muelleri
- Atrichopogon multidens
- Atrichopogon multiplex
- Atrichopogon multispinosa
- Atrichopogon myrmedon

== N ==
- Atrichopogon nahuelbutensis
- Atrichopogon nanus
- Atrichopogon natalensis
- Atrichopogon natans
- Atrichopogon nebulosus
- Atrichopogon nemestrinus
- Atrichopogon neocaledoniensis
- Atrichopogon nielamuensis
- Atrichopogon nigeriae
- Atrichopogon nigribasalis
- Atrichopogon nigripes
- Atrichopogon nigritellus
- Atrichopogon nigrithoracius
- Atrichopogon nigrithorax
- Atrichopogon nigrofuscus
- Atrichopogon nigromicans
- Atrichopogon nilicola
- Atrichopogon niloticus
- Atrichopogon nilssoni
- Atrichopogon novaeteutoniae
- Atrichopogon novaguinensis
- Atrichopogon nubeculosus
- Atrichopogon nudus

== O ==
- Atrichopogon obesus
- Atrichopogon obfuscatus
- Atrichopogon obnubilus
- Atrichopogon obscuripes
- Atrichopogon obscurus
- Atrichopogon occidentalis
- Atrichopogon ochrosoma
- Atrichopogon ocumare
- Atrichopogon oedemerarum
- Atrichopogon okinawensis
- Atrichopogon ollicula
- Atrichopogon orbicularis
- Atrichopogon orbitus
- Atrichopogon origenus
- Atrichopogon oriphilus
- Atrichopogon ornatipennis
- Atrichopogon ornatithorax
- Atrichopogon ornativentris
- Atrichopogon osiris
- Atrichopogon oviformis

== P ==
- Atrichopogon pachycnemus
- Atrichopogon pacificus
- Atrichopogon pallidicillus
- Atrichopogon pallidipedis
- Atrichopogon pallidipes
- Atrichopogon palmatus
- Atrichopogon palpalis
- Atrichopogon palus
- Atrichopogon parroti
- Atrichopogon parvulus
- Atrichopogon pastinaca
- Atrichopogon paulus
- Atrichopogon pavidus
- Atrichopogon pecteniventris
- Atrichopogon pectinatus
- Atrichopogon peculiaris
- Atrichopogon pedipalens
- Atrichopogon penicillatus
- Atrichopogon peregrinus
- Atrichopogon perfuscus
- Atrichopogon perplexus
- Atrichopogon peruvianus
- Atrichopogon petrosus
- Atrichopogon phusunensis
- Atrichopogon piceiventris
- Atrichopogon picipes
- Atrichopogon pictipennis
- Atrichopogon pileolus
- Atrichopogon planetus
- Atrichopogon planusunguis
- Atrichopogon poguei
- Atrichopogon polita
- Atrichopogon postremus
- Atrichopogon pruinosus
- Atrichopogon psilopterus
- Atrichopogon pterygospinous
- Atrichopogon pudicus
- Atrichopogon pullatus
- Atrichopogon pusillus

== Q ==
- Atrichopogon quadratepenis
- Atrichopogon quadrisetosus
- Atrichopogon quartibrunneus
- Atrichopogon quasicomatus
- Atrichopogon quateriharpagonum

== R ==
- Atrichopogon raripilipennis
- Atrichopogon redactus
- Atrichopogon remigatus
- Atrichopogon rhiphidius
- Atrichopogon rhynchops
- Atrichopogon rictus
- Atrichopogon rivalis
- Atrichopogon rostratus
- Atrichopogon rotundus
- Atrichopogon ruber
- Atrichopogon rubidus
- Atrichopogon rufescens
- Atrichopogon rufiventris
- Atrichopogon rusticus
- Atrichopogon ryukyuensis

== S ==
- Atrichopogon sachalinensis
- Atrichopogon salisburiensis
- Atrichopogon sallami
- Atrichopogon sanctaeclarae
- Atrichopogon sanctilaurentii
- Atrichopogon saundersi
- Atrichopogon schizonyx
- Atrichopogon scutatis
- Atrichopogon scutellaris
- Atrichopogon sebessi
- Atrichopogon semipilosus
- Atrichopogon sequax
- Atrichopogon sergioi
- Atrichopogon serrulatus
- Atrichopogon sessilis
- Atrichopogon setosicubitus
- Atrichopogon setosilateralis
- Atrichopogon setosus
- Atrichopogon seudoobfuscatus
- Atrichopogon shortlandi
- Atrichopogon sichotensis
- Atrichopogon silesiacus
- Atrichopogon similis
- Atrichopogon simplex
- Atrichopogon simplicifurcatus
- Atrichopogon singularis
- Atrichopogon sinuosus
- Atrichopogon snyderi
- Atrichopogon solivagus
- Atrichopogon sordidus
- Atrichopogon spadix
- Atrichopogon spartos
- Atrichopogon speculiger
- Atrichopogon sphagnalis
- Atrichopogon spinicaudalis
- Atrichopogon spiniventris
- Atrichopogon spinosus
- Atrichopogon spurius
- Atrichopogon stannusi
- Atrichopogon subcomatus
- Atrichopogon subfuscus
- Atrichopogon sublimatus
- Atrichopogon subtenuiatus
- Atrichopogon suburbanus
- Atrichopogon sulfuratus
- Atrichopogon sumatrae

== T ==
- Atrichopogon taeniatus
- Atrichopogon taizi
- Atrichopogon talarum
- Atrichopogon tapantiensis
- Atrichopogon tatricus
- Atrichopogon tegmentalis
- Atrichopogon tenuiatus
- Atrichopogon tenuidentis
- Atrichopogon tenuipalpis
- Atrichopogon tenuistylus
- Atrichopogon tetramischus
- Atrichopogon thersites
- Atrichopogon thienemanni
- Atrichopogon tirzae
- Atrichopogon titanus
- Atrichopogon transiens
- Atrichopogon transversus
- Atrichopogon trichopus
- Atrichopogon trichotomma
- Atrichopogon tricleaves
- Atrichopogon tridentistylus
- Atrichopogon trindadensis
- Atrichopogon tritomus
- Atrichopogon tropicus
- Atrichopogon tuberculatus
- Atrichopogon turneri
- Atrichopogon tutatus

== U ==
- Atrichopogon udus
- Atrichopogon umbratilis
- Atrichopogon umbrosus
- Atrichopogon unguis
- Atrichopogon unilineatus
- Atrichopogon urbicola
- Atrichopogon uruguayensis
- Atrichopogon utricularius

== V ==
- Atrichopogon varius
- Atrichopogon vastus
- Atrichopogon vepres
- Atrichopogon verax
- Atrichopogon vesiculosus
- Atrichopogon vestitipennis
- Atrichopogon vicinus
- Atrichopogon victoriae
- Atrichopogon vittatus
- Atrichopogon volaticus

== W ==
- Atrichopogon wallisensis
- Atrichopogon warmkei
- Atrichopogon websteri
- Atrichopogon winnertzi
- Atrichopogon wirthi
- Atrichopogon woodfordi
- Atrichopogon woodruffi
- Atrichopogon wuyishanicus

== X ==
- Atrichopogon xanthoaspidium
- Atrichopogon xanthophilus
- Atrichopogon xanthopus
- Atrichopogon xanthopygus
- Atrichopogon xylochus

== Y ==
- Atrichopogon yamabukiensis
- Atrichopogon yolancae
- Atrichopogon yongxinensis
- Atrichopogon yoshimurai

== Z ==
- Atrichopogon zhangmuensis
