= Jonathan Borden =

American neurosurgeon

- Born: October 31, 1962 (age 63)
- Occupation: Neurosurgeon
- Website: https://jonathanborden-md.com/

Jonathan Alan Borden (born October 31, 1962) is an American neurosurgeon who developed the Borden Classification of Dural Arteriovenous Fistulas. He has been involved in internet based telemedicine applications and is an editor of the RDDL specification for XML Namespaces.

== Education ==
Borden was born on October 31, 1962, in Rochester, New York. However, he was raised in Hartford, Connecticut. Borden graduated from Amherst College in Amherst, Massachusetts, with a Bachelor of Arts in Neuroscience and Yale University School of Medicine. He completed his internship and residency in Neurosurgery at Tufts University in Boston, Massachusetts.

== Research ==
His scientific work has involved the application of computer science to neurobiology. Borden's earliest work used artificial intelligence techniques to model neurochemical networks in the brain. He used computer graphics techniques to analyze the results of molecular biological experiments. Working in the laboratory of Elias Manuelidis and Laura Manuelidis at Yale School of Medicine, he authored papers on the organization of interphase chromosomes in human brain tissue.

At Tufts-New England Medical Center he developed the Borden Classification of Dural Arteriovenous Fistulas. This classification has come into common usage after its clinical applicability has been verified by the University of Toronto Brain AVM Group

Dr. Borden was an Assistant Professor of Neurosurgery at Tufts University in Boston from 1995 to 2002. He was the director of the Boston Gamma Knife Center. He and Tim Bray are co-editors of the RDDL specification. He authored the XMTP specification, an early method to represent SMTP/RFC 811 email in XML. He is an advisor for the Science Directorate of NASA, has been an invited expert for the World Wide Web Consortium Web Ontology Working Group and has been actively involved in the development and standardization of XML based electronic medical records.

More recently Dr. Borden has been involved in research studies aimed at repairing degenerated intervertebral discs using growth factors, stem cells and minimally invasive surgical techniques.
