= Frank O. Bastian =

American doctor and neuropathologist

Frank O. Bastian is an American physician and neuropathologist who worked at Louisiana State University before moving to a university in New Orleans in 2019. He specializes in transmissible spongiform encephalopathies (TSEs), which include bovine spongiform encephalopathy (BSE) in cattle, scrapie in sheep and goats, and Creutzfeldt–Jakob disease (CJD) in humans.

Bastian challenges the widely popular theory that TSEs are caused by prions, which are composed of a misfolded form of major prion protein (PrP). He argues that TSEs are caused by an extremely small, cell wall deficient bacterium called Spiroplasma, and that prions are the result of the disease process. The lack of a cell wall means the bacterium is not susceptible to most common antibiotics such as penicillin, which target cell wall synthesis.

- Bastian first found Spiroplasma in the brain of a CJD patient in an autopsy in 1979.
- He reported in 1984 that Spiroplasma mirum strain GT-48 induces a microcystic spongiform encephalopathy in suckling rats that is similar to CJD.
- In 2007 he isolated Spiroplasma from scrapie and chronic wasting disease (a TSE affecting deer, elk, and moose, abbreviated CWD), cultured them, and inoculated them into sheep and deer.
- In 2014 Bastian reported that Spiroplasma forms biofilms which give them significant resistance to radiation, heat, and disinfectants. The biofilms also contain amyloids. The same article revisits many earlier arguments, including ones not listed here, and includes several new ones besides the biofilm observation.

According to Bastian, the scrapie and CWD Spiroplasma isolates caused a spongiform encephalopathy identical to scrapie and CWD. Under his hypothesis, prion protein scrapie (PrPSc) is not the cause; it is merely an imperfect marker of infection (with both sensitivity and NPV <1), and is either induced by Spiroplasma directly or by a defence mechanism of the host.

Bastian, along with Laura Manuelidis of Yale University, who claims that TSEs are caused by an as yet undiscovered virus, are two of the main skeptics of the prion theory. Other scientists have so far been unable to duplicate his results, casting doubt on this hypothesis. Bastian however maintains that the inability to detect Spiroplasma in 100% of cases stems from genetic variability.

== See also ==
- Laura Manuelidis
- Stanley Prusiner
- Prion
- Slow virus
- Virino
- Spiroplasma
