= Spiroplasma phage 1-R8A2B =

- Shape of Plectrovirus virion

Virus classification
- (unranked): Virus
- Realm: Efunaviria
- Kingdom: Loebvirae
- Phylum: Hofneiviricota
- Class: Faserviricetes
- Order: Tubulavirales
- Family: Plectroviridae
- Genus: Verspertiliovirus
- Species: Spiroplasma phage 1-R8A2B

Species of virus

Spiroplasma phage 1-R8A2B is a filamentous bacteriophage in the genus Vespertiliovirus of the family Plectroviridae, part of the group of single-stranded DNA viruses. The virus has many synonyms, such as SpV1-R8A2 B, Spiroplasma phage 1, and Spiroplasma virus 1, SpV1 (not to be confused with simply "SpV1" which refers to the entire spiroplasma virus morphological group 1). SpV1-R8A2 B infects Spiroplasma citri. Its host itself is a prokaryotic pathogen for citrus plants, causing Citrus stubborn disease.

== Classification ==
The phage is a spiroplasmal virus of morphologic group 1 (SpV1), isolated from Spiroplasma citri strain R8A2 (SpV1-R8A2) subclone B (SpV1-R8A2 B). SpV1 viruses are classified by their naked rods.

== History ==
=== Documentation ===
SpV1 virus-like particles were initially observed by electron microscopy in 1973 during the first ultrastructural characterization of S. citri. Nearly two decades later, in 1990, the specific strain of SpV1-R8A2 B was first reported in the publication of its complete nucleotide sequence of its genome.

=== Derivation of Names ===
The prefixes for the family and genus are both derived from Greek: Ino is from nos, meaning "muscle filament," and Plectro is from plektron, meaning "small stick."

== Virion ==
=== Morphology ===
Group 1 spiroplasmal viruses are long, non-enveloped, filamentous (rod-shaped) particles containing a circular, ssDNA molecule of around 8 kilobases. The rods are nearly straight with one rounded end and one more variable end. Their lengths are about 300 nm or less and their diameters are about 15 nm with 4 ± 2 nm hollow cores.

They also lack lipids.

=== Genome ===
SpV1-R8A2 B's complete genome contains 8273 nucleotides totaling 37.1% A, 8.1% C, 14.8% G, and 40% T. (UGA does not specify a stop codon in spiroplasmas; instead, the universal opal stop codon, UGA, codes for tryptophan.) It has 22.9% GC-content. Altogether, the phage has 12 coding sequences (CDS) and 12 genes.

=== Physiochemical and physical properties ===
Virions of SpV1 are sensitive to chloroform and ether. They are resistant to cold and heat, a wide range of pH, and non-ionic detergents (Nonidet P-40 and Triton X-100). SpV1 buoyant densities are 1.39 g/cm^{3}in CsCl and 1.21 g/cm^{3} in metrizamide.

== Host ==
=== Spiroplasma citri ===
Spiroplasma phages affect members of the genus Spiroplasma, which are part of the class Mollicutes, a group of small bacteria without cell walls. In particular, SpV1-R8A2 B infects S. citri, originally found on the Morocco strain. S. citri is the causative agent of Citrus stubborn disease on plants of the genus Citrus.

=== Infection ===
There is a high frequency of SpV1 natural infection found in Spiroplasma strains. An early electron microscopic study of negatively stained preparations revealed SpV1 particles in 38 of 67 Spiroplasma strains examined (57%). A single virus particle is enough to infect a host cell. Infection is nonlytic.

==== Integration ====
The S. citri chromosome contains CDS of plectrovirus prophages at multiple sites, often truncated, and many homologous to SpV1. There is evidence that shows, in the partially sequenced S. citri genome, at least 20.5% of CDS are phage-related, while 47.2% of CDS are of unknown function. These sequences of unknown function could be remnants of viral sequence insertions, a common feature with other Mollicute genomes, as they contain repeated clusters of genes that could be "mobile genetic elements or remnants of ancient phage attacks." Insertion of the viral sequences occurs by encoded putative transposases resembling those of insertion elements. Integration of a plectrovirus genome can occur upon viral infection.

==== Resistance ====
Resistance has also been shown to occur with subsequent infection.

==== Consequences ====
Insertion sequence elements may have resulted in gene disruptions, genome rearrangements, and genome expansions.

== Replication ==
=== Life cycle via cytoplasmic replication ===
As a Plectrovirus, the phage's entry mechanism is adsorption to membrane-bound cellular receptors. Transcription takes place in the cytoplasm with a cellular enzyme transcriptase. Genome replication occurs within the cellular membrane in the cytoplasm. Host cell DNA-dependent DNA polymerase serves as the replicase, and replication occurs by rolling circle. Virion assembly takes place in the cellular membrane. The phage's exit mechanism is by extrusion.

The typical replication cycle of Inoviridae:

1. Viral g3p protein mediates pilus-mediated adsorption of the virus onto host cell. Pilus retraction pulls the virion to the host internal membrane.
2. The proteins of the capsid mediate the injection of the viral DNA through bacterial membranes into cell cytoplasm.
3. Host polymerase convert the (+)ssDNA viral genome into a covalently closed dsDNA called replicative form DNA (RF).
4. dsDNA transcription by host RNA polymerase gives rise to viral mRNAs.
5. Viral g2p protein nicks RF DNA strand at the origin of replication.
6. (+)strand replication occurs by rolling circle.
7. New (+)ssDNA genomes are converted into new RF molecules, and further transcription occurs.
8. When enough g5p protein is synthesized, conversion into RF dsDNA is inhibited, as neo-synthesized genomic ssDNA is covered with g5p.
9. g5p are replaced by g8p proteins to trigger the assembly of the viral capsid.
10. New virions are secreted from host cell.
11. Infected cells continue to divide and produce virions indefinitely.

=== Uses ===
The replicative form of SpV1 has been attempted to be used as a vector to express foreign genes in S. citri R8A2. The goal is to allow foreign genes to be transcribed, translated into proteins, and maintained in a stable form for generations. However, the recombinant viral DNA can prove to be unstable after passaging.

SpV1-R8A2 B can be isolated from its host. The replicative form can be cloned in E. coli. Purification before culturing can be accomplished by CsCl density gradient centrifugation.
