= Laura Manuelidis =

American biochemist

- Born: Laura Kirchman; Brooklyn, New York, United States
- Education: Sarah Lawrence College, B.A. 1963; Yale Medical School, M.D. 1967
- Occupations: Physician, professor
- Years active: 1967–present
- Known for: Research into Creutzfeldt-Jakob disease
- Spouse: Elias E. Manuelidis
- Children: 2

Laura Manuelidis (born Laura Kirchman) is an American physician and neuropathologist. She is the head of neuropathology at Yale University, where she teaches and conducts research on neurodegenerative diseases.

== Career ==
Laura Manuelidis was born Laura Kirchman in Brooklyn, New York to a teacher and an architect. Manuelidis earned her B.A. from Sarah Lawrence College in 1963, where she studied poetry, and she received her M.D. from Yale Medical School in 1967.

Manuelidis is the head of neuropathology in the surgery department at Yale and is also a member of the neuroscience and virology faculty. She has been active on numerous government committees, including the Alzheimer's disease advisory panel and the US Food and Drug Administration advisory panel, has been a member of editorial boards, and chair of international meetings. She has also published three books of poetry, one of these being a volume of poetry titled "Out of Order" (2007).

== Achievements ==
Manuelidis has made major contributions in two areas: A) the discovery of large chromosomal DNA repeats and the elucidation of their role in the organization and structure of chromosomes in metaphase and interphase nuclei; B) the experimental investigation of the infectious agents that cause human transmissible spongiform encephalopathy (TSE) diseases including Creutzfeldt–Jakob disease (CJD), kuru and bovine spongiform encephalopathy ("mad cow disease"). Transmission to small animals and cells in culture exposed basic biologic and molecular agent facts most consistent with an exponentially replicating ~25 nm viral particle that contains an essential but unknown nucleic acid for infection. This contrasts with the assertion that the host encoded amyloid forming prion protein, without nucleic acid, is the infectious agent.

=== Chromosome Sequence and Structure ===
Early in her career, Manuelidis discovered major unknown DNA sequence motifs and demonstrated their megabase organization in metaphase chromosomes and interphase nuclei. Using restriction enzymes on whole human DNA and extracting specific gel bands, an approach no one had used previously for whole mammalian genomes, she discovered human complex repeated (α satellite) DNA sequences and localized them in centromeres. They were homologous to simian, but not simpler mouse centromere repeats. These late replicating sequences, that contain few, if any, genes, define all human chromosome centromeres as shown by the development of high resolution in-situ hybridization.

As in other mammalian cells, centromeres are critical for proper segregation of chromosomes between two new daughter cells during mitosis, and the discovery and localization of these satellite sequences have facilitated diagnosis of trisomy and chromosomal aberrations in genetic diseases and tumors.

Manuelidis also discovered, isolated, and sequenced the human long interspersed L1 repeats (LINES) and showed they contained a transcriptional open reading frame. She found these abundant L1 repeats concentrated in Giemsa dark bands on chromosome arms that contain many tissue-specific genes, whereas ALU short repeats concentrate in light bands with the majority of housekeeping genes.

L1 repeats are conserved in evolution and show 70% homology to mouse L1 repeats. After retroviral HIV was sequenced, others deduced that L1 repeats were retroviral. It became clear that these ancient large retroviral invaders entered the genome and were symbiotically transfigured, or pathologically tamed, during evolution to attain a structural, and possibly functional role in megabase chromosome band domains. The enormous sizes of L1 and ALU rich domains were also demonstrated by pulse-field electrophoresis.

Additional endogenous retroviral DNAs, such as those that produce retroviral intracisternal A particles (IAP) in rodents, as well as less numerous human endogenous retroviral repeats, are also integrated in specific chromosome locations. This further undermines the assumption repeated DNAs are parasitic "junk".

Manuelidis also opened up the field of 3-dimensional chromosome structure in the interphase nucleus of differentiated cells by combining optical serial sections and high resolution in-situ hybridization of specific DNA sequences. These studies dramatically transfigured the picture of interphase nuclei. Previously, interphase compartments were viewed as ill-defined dense heterochromatic blobs beside unorganized euchromatic chromatin spaghetti with no cohesive 3-D structure. In differentiated neurons very distinct patterns of individual centromere positions were demonstrated for each neuronal subtype. These positions are conserved in evolution even though centromeric DNA repeats are species-specific. By charting the movement of the X chromosome in large neurons in epilepsy, and the movement of centromeres during post-mitotic neuronal development, dynamic changes of large chromosome were illuminated. High-resolution mapping of whole individual human chromosomes in mouse and hamster-hybrid human cells further showed each chromosome was compact and occupied its own individual space or "territory".

An architectural model of chromosomes as they transit from metaphase to interphase fits the known DNA compaction in diploid cells and allows for rapid transitions and segregation during mitosis, as well as local extensions that accommodate transcription. Mapping of whole individual chromosomes using high resolution DNA hybridization of chromosome specific libraries developed here subsequently were useful for resolving chromosome changes in complex genetic diseases and tumor progression. Finally, the insertion of a huge 11 megabase transgene of the globin exon (lacking introns) was recognized by cells, and silenced by compaction together with transcriptionally inert heterochromatic centromeres in neurons. This demonstrates that uninterrupted repeats are capable of inducing specific functional and structural changes during interphase. It is likely that this feature operates sequentially during cell differentiation.

=== Human TSE agents: Biology, structure and infectious characteristics ===
The lab of EE Manuelidis and L Manuelidis was the first to serially transmit human Creutzfeldt–Jakob disease (CJD) to guinea pigs and small rodents. This made it possible to demonstrate fundamental mechanisms of infection, including TSE agent uptake and spread via myeloid cells of the blood, a common route for most viruses. A lack of maternal transmission of sporadic CJD (sCJD) in long lived guinea pigs, contrasts with the proposed germline inheritance of sCJD. As with viruses, different species vary in their susceptibility to specific TSE agent strains. Major agent strain distinctions from scrapie are encoded by different human TSE agents, such as sCJD, kuru of New Guinea, bovine-linked vCJD, and Asiatic CJD. These were discovered and documented though experimental transmissions to normal mice, hamsters and monotypic cell cultures at Yale. Prion protein bands fail to distinguish very different TSE strains in standard mouse brains.

Manuelidis and colleagues were the first to show that prion protein amyloid was derived from a glycosylated 34kd precursor protein using lectins. PrP antibodies and selected lectins bound to the same protein in both normal and CJD and scrapie infected brain fractions. Additionally, the correct sugar sequence of PrP was first demonstrated in the Manuelidis lab by sequential deglycosylation and unmasking of sugar residues. Manuelidis and colleagues also developed monotypic cell cultures infected by many different human and sheep scrapie TSE strains, and developed rapid quantitative assays of infectious titers of 1 million fold or more for each strain. As in the brain, misfolded PrP amounts show less than a 5 fold increase and could not even distinguish greater than 100 fold differences in infectivity of cultured agent strains. These culture studies further showed that PrP band patterns are cell-type dependent. Only rare strains show a PrP folding pattern that is distinctive in either brain or in monotypic cells, and a change in PrP bands does not induce any change in strain characteristics. Moreover, TSE strains modify each other's replication in a virus-like fashion. Experiments in mice, and GT hypothalamic neuronal cells in culture, show both inhibitory and additive infectivity by two different TSE strains: one TSE strain can inhibit replication of a second more virulent strain whereas two different strains can both simultaneously infect cells.

Finally, dramatic changes in agent doubling time (weeks to a day) were documented for many TSE strains. TSE agents replicate every 24 hrs in culture, in marked contrast to their very slow and strain specific replication in the brain. This rapid agent replication in culture is likely due to release of agent constraints from the many complex host immune system in animals. These include early microglial responses. PrP amyloid itself can also behave as a defensive innate immune response to TSE agent infection, and high levels of PrP amyloid can abolish 99.999% of infectivity.

== Prion hypothesis ==
Manueldis has challenged the dominant assertion that host prion protein (PrP), without any nucleic acid, is the causal infectious agent in TSEs. The prion hypothesis was put forth by Stanley B. Prusiner, who won the 1997 Nobel Prize in Physiology or Medicine. In contrast to the amyloid or "infectious form of host PrP", Manuelidis and colleagues showed that infectious CJD 25nm brain particles had a homogeneous viral density and size and separated from most prion protein. Disruption of CJD nucleic acid-protein complexes destroys infectivity. Comparable 25 nm particles were also identified within CJD and scrapie infected cell cultures, but not in uninfected controls. As with isolated 25 nm brain particles, cultured cells particles did not bind PrP antibodies.

Manuelidis stated that "Although much work remains to be done, there is a reasonable possibility these are the long sought viral particles that cause transmissible spongiform encephalopathies". She claims that misfolded prion protein probably is not infectious, and that there is no independent confirmation that recombinant PrP can be converted to an infectious form. However, the Prusiner group has published evidence of precisely the kind of conversion that Manueldis claims there is no evidence for. As originally proposed, misfolded PrP amyloid might be an infectious structure or a pathological response protein. Later evidence favored the pathological concept, with infectious viral particles binding to and converting receptor PrP to an amyloid form. Much additional evidence points to an exogenous source of infectious TSE agents, and the claim that recombinant PrP can be made infectious has not been reproducible. In fact, one can remove all detectable forms of PrP from infectious brain particles, yet these particles retain high infectivity. Thus, PrP may not be an integral or required component of the infectious particle. On the other hand, all high infectivity scrapie and CJD fractions contain nucleic acids when analyzed using modern amplification strategies. When these nucleic acids are destroyed with nucleases that have no effect on PrP, 99.8% of the infectious titer is abolished. Novel circular SPHINX DNAs from the microbiome of 1.8kb and 2.4kb have been identified in isolated infectious particles, but their role in infection and/or disease is not yet clear because they are also present at much lower levels in non-infectious preparations. Only a few infectious particle nucleic acid sequences have been analyzed to date. Nevertheless, host innate immune responses, including a remarkably strong interferon response to infection, further demonstrate TSE agents are recognized as foreign infectious invaders. Misfolded PrP does not elicit this effect.

== See also ==
- Frank Bastian
- Stanley Prusiner
- Prion
- Slow virus
- Virino
- Spiroplasma
