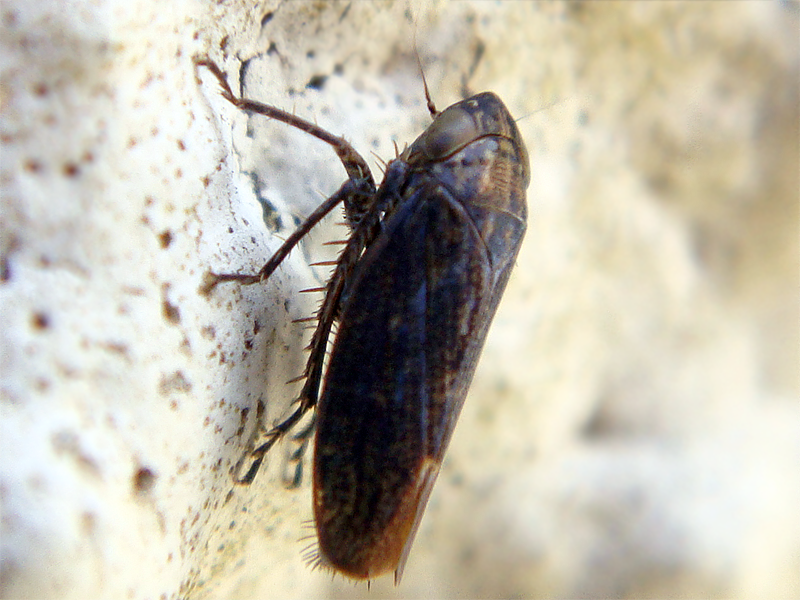
- Euscelis sp.

Scientific classification
- Domain: Eukaryota
- Kingdom: Animalia
- Phylum: Arthropoda
- Class: Insecta
- Order: Hemiptera
- Suborder: Auchenorrhyncha
- Family: Cicadellidae
- Tribe: Athysanini
- Genus: Euscelis; Brullé 1832

Species
- See text

Synonyms
- Phrynomorphus Curtis, 1833

= Euscelis =

Genus of true bugs

Euscelis is a leafhopper genus in the subfamily Deltocephalinae.

== Species ==
- Euscelis alsioides Remane, 1967
- Euscelis alsius Ribaut, 1952
- Euscelis ancoripenis Remane, 1967
- Euscelis caucasica Emeljanov, 1962
- Euscelis caudata Osborn, 1926
- Euscelis chamaespartii Remane, 2002
- Euscelis corhelita Remane, 2002
- Euscelis curticeps Lindberg, 1927
- Euscelis distinguenda (Kirschbaum, 1858)
- Euscelis genisticola Remane, 1967
- Euscelis gredincola Remane, 2002
- Euscelis hamulus (Kuoh, 1981)
- Euscelis heptneri Zachvatkin, 1945
- Euscelis hiertalba Remane, 2002
- Euscelis himargeni Remane, 2002
- Euscelis incisa (Kirschbaum, 1858)
- Euscelis lineolata Brullé, 1832
- Euscelis marocisus Remane, 1988
- Euscelis nemesia (Cogan, 1916)
- Euscelis ohausi Wagner, 1939
- Euscelis ononidis Remane, 1967
- Euscelis ormaderensis Remane, 1968
- Euscelis quinquemaculata Osborn, 1923
- Euscelis remanei Strübing, 1980
- Euscelis seriphidii Emeljanov, 1962
- Euscelis siquadristriata Remane, 1967
- Euscelis taigacolus Dlabola, 1971
- Euscelis tuvensis Vilbaste, 1980
- Euscelis ulicis Ribaut, 1952
- Euscelis venitala Remane, Bückle & Guglielmino, 2005
- Euscelis venosa (Kirschbaum, 1868)
