= Dural arteriovenous fistula =

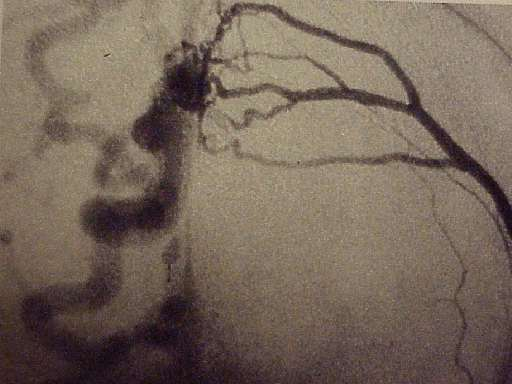
- This dural arteriovenous fistula of the superior sagittal sinus drains into subarachnoid veins and is classified as Borden type IIIb.
- Specialty: Neurology; Neurosurgery
- Symptoms: Cognitive changes, including memory loss, rapidly progressive dementia, dyscalculia, hallucinations, psychomotoric slowing, apathy, disorientation, executive dysfunction; Parkinsonism; Headache; Visual impairment, blurred vision; Tinnitus; Urinary incontinence; Myoclonus
- Complications: Hemorrhagic stroke, cardiomegaly
- Diagnostic method: Medical imaging: Magnetic Resonance Imaging; Magnetic Resonance Angiography; Digital Substraction Angiography; SPECT
- Treatment: Arteriovenous fistula obliteration, including: embolization; surgery; radiosurgery

A dural arteriovenous fistula (DAVF) or malformation is an abnormal direct connection (fistula) between a meningeal artery and a meningeal vein or dural venous sinus.

== Signs and symptoms ==
The most common signs/symptoms of DAVFs are:

1. Pulsatile tinnitus
2. Occipital bruit
3. Headache
4. Visual impairment
5. Papilledema

Pulsatile tinnitus is the most common symptom in patients, and it is associated with transverse-sigmoid sinus DAVFs. Carotid-cavernous DAVFs, on the other hand, are more closely associated with pulsatile exophthalmos. DAVFs may also be asymptomatic (e.g. cavernous sinus DAVFs).

=== Location ===
Most commonly found adjacent to dural sinuses in the following locations:

1. Transverse (lateral) sinus, left-sided slightly more common than right
2. Intratentorial
3. From the posterior cavernous sinus, usually draining to the transverse or sigmoid sinuses
4. Vertebral artery (posterior meningeal branch)

== Causes ==
It is still unclear whether DAVFs are congenital or acquired. Current evidence supports transverse-sigmoid sinus junction dural malformations are acquired defects, occurring in response to thrombosis and collateral revascularization of a venous sinus.

== Diagnosis ==
Cerebral angiography is the diagnostic standard. MRIs are typically normal but can identify venous hypertension as a result of arterial-venous shunting.

=== Classification ===
==== Borden Classification ====
The Borden Classification of dural arteriovenous malformations or fistulas, groups into three types based upon their venous drainage:

1. Type I: dural arterial supply drains anterograde into venous sinus.
2. Type II: dural arterial supply drains into venous sinus. High pressure in sinus results in both anterograde drainage and retrograde drainage via subarachnoid veins.
3. Type III: dural arterial supply drains retrograde into subarachnoid veins.

===== Type I =====
Type I dural arteriovenous fistulas are supplied by meningeal arteries and drain into a meningeal vein or dural venous sinus. The flow within the draining vein or venous sinus is anterograde.

1. Type Ia – simple dural arteriovenous fistulas have a single meningeal arterial supply
2. Type Ib – more complex arteriovenous fistulas are supplied by multiple meningeal arteries

The distinction between Types Ia and Ib is somewhat specious as there is a rich system of meningeal arterial collaterals. Type I dural fistulas are often asymptomatic, do not have a high risk of bleeding and do not necessarily need to be treated.

===== Type II =====
The high pressure within a Type II dural AV fistula causes blood to flow in a retrograde fashion into subarachnoid veins which normally drain into the sinus. Typically this is because the sinus has outflow obstruction. Such draining veins form venous varices or aneurysms which can bleed. Type II fistulas need to be treated to prevent hemorrhage. The treatment may involve embolization of the draining sinus as well as clipping or embolization of the draining veins.

===== Type III =====
Type III dural AV fistulas drain directly into subarachnoid veins. These veins can form aneurysms and bleed. Type III dural fistulas need to be treated to prevent hemorrhage. Treatment can be as simple as clipping the draining vein at the site of the dural sinus. If treatment involves embolization, it will only typically be effective if the glue traverses the actual fistula and enters, at least slightly, the draining vein.

The Cognard et al. Classification correlates venous drainage patterns with increasingly aggressive neurological clinical course.

Classification	Location and clinical course
Type I	Confined to sinus wall, typically after thrombosis.
Type II	IIa - confined to sinus with reflux (retrograde) into sinus but not cortical veins. IIb - drains into sinus with reflux (retrograde) into cortical veins (10-20% hemorrhage).
Type III	Drains direct into cortical veins (not into sinus) drainage (40% hemorrhage).
Type IV	Drains direct into cortical veins (not into sinus) drainage with venous ectasia (65% hemorrhage).
Type V	Spinal perimedullary venous drainage, associated with progressive myelopathy.

To simplify the above systems of DAVF classification, the two main factors that should be considered to determine aggressiveness of these lesions are:

- DAVF that have bleed (as opposed to those that have not before)
- DAVF resulting in cortical venous reflux

Treatment decisions are more complicated and require a consultation with a multidisciplinary team consisting of at least a interventional neuroradiologist, neurosurgeon and radiotherapist familiar with these lesions.

== Treatment ==
=== Indications ===
- Hemorrhage
- Neurologic dysfunction or refractory symptoms

=== Interventions ===
==== Embolization ====
One approach used for treatment is embolization. A six-vessel angiogram is employed to determine the vascular supply to the fistula. Detachable coils, liquid embolic agents like NBCA, and onyx, or combinations of both are injected into the blood vessel to occlude the DAVF. Preoperative embolization can also be used to supplement surgery.

==== Surgery ====
DAVFs are also managed surgically. The operative approach varies depending on the location of the lesion.

===== Stereotactic radiosurgery =====
Stereotactic radiosurgery is used for obliterating DAVFs sometimes in conjunction with embolization or surgery, and is considered an important adjunct and sometimes a primary treatment method for non-aggressive DAVFs. Use of this method, however, is limited as obliteration occurs over the course of up to 2–3 years after the delivery of radiation.

== Epidemiology ==
10–15% of intracranial AV malformations are DAVFs. There is a higher preponderance in females (61–66%), and typically patients are in their fourth or fifth decade of life. DAVFs are rarer in children.

== Research ==
External Manual Carotid Compression is Effective in Patients with Cavernous Sinus Dural Arteriovenous Fistulaetreatment. The patients were instructed to compress the carotid artery and jugular vein with the contralateral hand for ten seconds several times each hour (about 6 to 15 times per day).

== See also ==
- Arteriovenous fistula
