= Atrichopogon silesiacus =

Scientific classification
- Domain: Eukaryota
- Kingdom: Animalia
- Phylum: Arthropoda
- Class: Insecta
- Order: Diptera
- Family: Ceratopogonidae
- Genus: Atrichopogon
- Species: A. silesiacus

Binomial name
- Atrichopogon silesiacus Kieffer, 1919

Species of flies

Atrichopogon silesiacus is a species of flies in the family Ceratopogonidae, first described by Jean-Jacques Kieffer in 1919.
