= Stanley B. Prusiner =

American neurologist and chemist (born 1942)

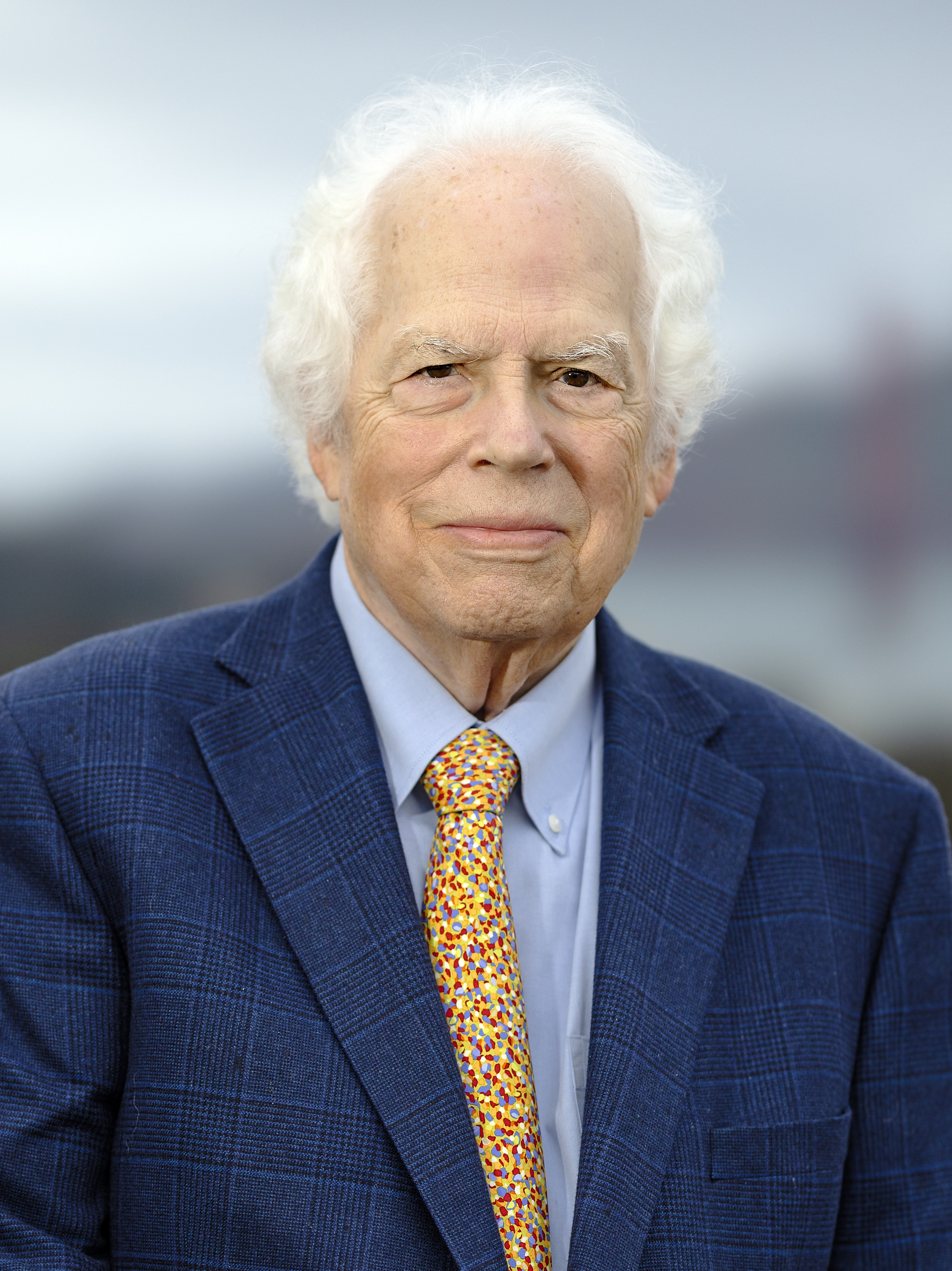
- Prusiner in 2024
- Born: Stanley Ben Prusiner; May 28, 1942 (age 84); Des Moines, Iowa, U.S.
- Education: University of Pennsylvania (BA, MD)
- Known for: Prions; Transmissible spongiform encephalopathy; Creutzfeldt–Jakob disease
- Children: 2
- Awards: Potamkin Prize (1991); Metlife Foundation Award for Medical Research in Alzheimer's Disease (1991); Dickson Prize (1993); Richard Lounsbery Award (1993); Lasker Award (1994); Keio Medical Science Prize (1996); Wolf Prize in Medicine (1996); Louisa Gross Horwitz Prize (1997); Nobel Prize in Physiology or Medicine (1997); ForMemRS (1997); Sir Hans Krebs Medal (1999); National Medal of Science (2010)
- Scientific career
- Fields: Neurology; Infectious diseases
- Workplaces: University of California, San Francisco
- Website: ind.ucsf.edu/our-people/stanley-b-prusiner-md

Stanley Ben Prusiner (born May 28, 1942) is an American neurologist and biochemist. He is the founding director of the Institute for Neurodegenerative Diseases (IND) at the University of California, San Francisco (UCSF). Prusiner discovered prions, a class of infectious self-reproducing pathogens primarily or solely composed of protein, a scientific theory considered by many as a heretical idea when first proposed. He received the Albert Lasker Award for Basic Medical Research in 1994 and the Nobel Prize in Physiology or Medicine in 1997 for research on prion diseases developed by him and his team of experts (among them D. E. Garfin, D. P. Stites, W. J. Hadlow and C. M. Eklund) beginning in the early 1970s.

== Early life, career and research ==
Prusiner was born into a Jewish family in Des Moines, Iowa, the son of Miriam (Spigel) and Lawrence Prusiner, an architect. He spent his childhood in Des Moines and Cincinnati, Ohio, where he attended Walnut Hills High School, where he was known as "the little genius" for his groundbreaking work on a repellent for Boxelder bugs. Prusiner received a Bachelor of Arts degree in chemistry from the University of Pennsylvania and later received his M.D. from the University of Pennsylvania School of Medicine. Prusiner then completed an internship in medicine at the University of California, San Francisco. Later Prusiner moved to the National Institutes of Health, where he studied glutaminases in E. coli in the laboratory of Earl Stadtman.

After three years at NIH, Prusiner returned to UCSF to complete a residency in neurology. Upon completion of the residency in 1974, Prusiner joined the faculty of the UCSF Department of Neurology. Since that time, Prusiner has held various faculty and visiting faculty positions at both UCSF and UC Berkeley.

In 1999, Prusiner founded the IND at UCSF. The IND conducts research on neurodegenerative diseases that are caused by the accumulation of misfolded proteins. These include Creutzfeldt–Jakob disease, Alzheimer's disease, synucleinopathies and tauopathies.

== Prion: a heretical idea ==
In his 1998 PNAS review article on prions, Prusiner wrote "The idea that scrapie prions were composed of an amyloidogenic protein was truly heretical when it was introduced" by Tikvah Alper. Transmissible spongiform encephalopathies, such as scrapie and bovine spongiform encephalopathy ("mad cow disease"), are diseases that leave the brains of their victims full of holes. Scientists did not know what pathogen or disease-causing organism produced such a pattern. Prusiner and his co-workers suggested "one scientific theory, viewed as heretical in that it seems to challenge the role of nucleic acids as the exclusive carriers of genetic information." This theory suggested that the pathogen causing prion diseases might be a "deadly variety of a normal protein that has the ability to amplify itself in the brain. The hypothetical protein is called a prion (pronounced PREE-on)," a portmanteau based on the words "proteinaceous" and "infectious".

== Awards and honors ==
Stanley Prusiner was awarded the Nobel Prize in Physiology or Medicine in 1997 for his work in proposing an explanation for the cause of scrapie, bovine spongiform encephalopathy and human prion diseases such as Creutzfeldt–Jakob disease. He was elected to the National Academy of Sciences in 1992 and to its governing council in 2007. He is also an elected member of the American Academy of Arts and Sciences (1993), a Foreign Member of the Royal Society (ForMemRS) in 1997, and a member of the American Philosophical Society (1998) and the National Academy of Medicine (1992).

- Potamkin Prize for Alzheimer's Disease Research from the American Academy of Neurology (1991)
- Metlife Foundation Award for Medical Research in Alzheimer's Disease (1991)
- The Richard Lounsbery Award for Extraordinary Scientific Research in Biology and Medicine from the National Academy of Sciences (1993)
- Dickson Prize (1993)
- The Gairdner Foundation International Award (1993)
- The Albert Lasker Award for Basic Medical Research (1994)
- The Paul Ehrlich and Ludwig Darmstaedter Prize from the Federal Republic of Germany (1995)
- The Wolf Prize in Medicine from the Wolf Foundation (1996)
- Grand Prix Charles-Leopold Mayer (1996)
- The Keio International Award for Medical Science (1996)
- Golden Plate Award of the American Academy of Achievement (1996)
- The Louisa Gross Horwitz Prize from Columbia University (1997)
- The Nobel Prize in Physiology or Medicine (1997)
- The Benjamin Franklin Medal from the Franklin Institute (1998)
- Honorary Doctorate from CEU Cardinal Herrera University (2005)
- The National Medal of Science (2010)

== See also ==
- Frank Bastian
- Daniel Carleton Gajdusek
- Laura Manuelidis
- List of Jewish Nobel laureates
