= Spiroplasma poulsonii =

Scientific classification
- Domain: Bacteria
- Kingdom: Bacillati
- Phylum: Mycoplasmatota
- Class: Mollicutes
- Order: Mycoplasmatales
- Family: Spiroplasmataceae
- Genus: Spiroplasma
- Species: S. poulsonii

Binomial name
- Spiroplasma poulsonii Williamson et al. 1999

Species of bacterium

Spiroplasma poulsonii are bacteria of the genus Spiroplasma that are commonly endosymbionts of flies. These bacteria live in the hemolymph (insect blood) of the flies, where they can act as reproductive manipulators or defensive symbionts.

== Biology ==
Spiroplasma poulsonii is a maternally transmitted symbiont, meaning it is primarily inherited through the female germ line. This involves the co-option of the fly yolk proteins, which allow the symbiont to enter the developing ovary. In the fly hemolymph, S. poulsonii feeds on lipids as its primary food source.

== Male-killing ==
The Drosophila melanogaster S. poulsonii strain MSRO kills D. melanogaster eggs fertilized by Y-bearing sperm. This mode of reproductive manipulation benefits the symbiont as the female fly has a greater reproductive output than males. Thus, by increasing the number of daughters the fly mother produces, the symbiont increases its ability to spread through the increased reproductive output of female flies. Male-killing requires the presence of a functional dosage compensation process in its fly host. The genetic basis of this male-killing was discovered in 2018, and the gene named "SpAID" for "Spiroplasma poulsonii AndrocIDin," in line with previous studies that referred to the then-unknown factor as the S. poulsonii androcidin. SpAID takes advantage of host dosage compensation machinery causing DNA damage to the male X chromosome, leading to a failure of the male X chromosome to organize and model its chromatin structure.

The discovery of SpAID solved a mystery dating back to the 1950s of how the bacteria targeted male-specific cells. In an interview with the Global Health Institute, Dr. Toshiyuki Harumoto said: "To our knowledge, Spaid is the first bacterial effector protein identified to date that affects host cellular machinery in a sex-specific manner..."

== Defensive symbiosis ==
A dissected mushroom-feeding Drosophila infected with Howardula nematodes

The S. poulsonii strain of Drosophila neotestacea can defend its host from attack by nematodes and parasitic wasps. This defence is important enough that S. poulsonii has spread westward across North America due to the selective pressure imposed by the sterilizing nematode parasite Howardula aoronymphium.

The mechanism through which S. poulsonii protects flies from nematodes and parasitic wasps relies on the presence of toxins called ribosome-inactivating proteins (RIPs), similar to sarcin or ricin. These toxins depurinate a conserved adenine site in eukaryotic 28s ribosomal RNA called the Sarcin-Ricin loop by cleaving the N-glycosidic bond between the rRNA backbone and the adenine, leaving a signature of RIP attack in nematode and wasp RNA. Spiroplasma poulsonii likely avoids damaging its host fly by carrying parasite-specific complements of RIP toxins encoded on bacterial plasmids. This allows genes for RIP toxins to readily move between species by horizontal gene transfer, as D. neotestacea Spiroplasma RIPs are shared by Spiroplasma of other mushroom-feeding flies, such as Megaselia nigra. The S. poulsonii strain of Drosophila melanogaster can also attack parasitoid wasps, but its impact on survival of the host fly itself is variable, and dependent on wasp species and strain.
