= Spiroplasma mirum =

Scientific classification
- Domain: Bacteria
- Kingdom: Bacillati
- Phylum: Mycoplasmatota
- Class: Mollicutes
- Order: Mycoplasmatales
- Family: Mycoplasmataceae
- Genus: Spiroplasma
- Species: S. mirum

Binomial name
- Spiroplasma mirum Tully et al. 1982

Synonyms
- Spiroplasma atrichopogonis Koerber et al. 2005

Species of bacterium

Spiroplasma mirum is a bacterium in the genus Spiroplasma originally discovered in the rabbit tick Haemaphysalis leporispalustris in 1964. This original strain, after serial passage, led to the SMCA (suckling mouse cataract agent) group of strains which causes cataracts in suckling (newborn) rats and mice. At the time of its description as a species in 1982, two other strains have been isolated from rabbit ticks.

Of the three strains or groups of strains known in 1982, all were known to cause lethal infections in developing chicken eggs and cataracts in newborn rats and mice. In other words, SMCA is not unique in its ability to cause cataracts. SMCA is pathogenic in young Syrian hamsters without causing cataracts but with multi-organ spread and possible death from hemorrhage. It was once believed to cause transmissible spongiform encephalopathy, though the prion hypothesis has since stood up to more tests.

A heterotypic synonym is Spiroplasma atrichopogonis. The type strain of this name was found in Atrichopogon biting-midges. Its genome was not sufficiently different from S. mirum to be its own species.
