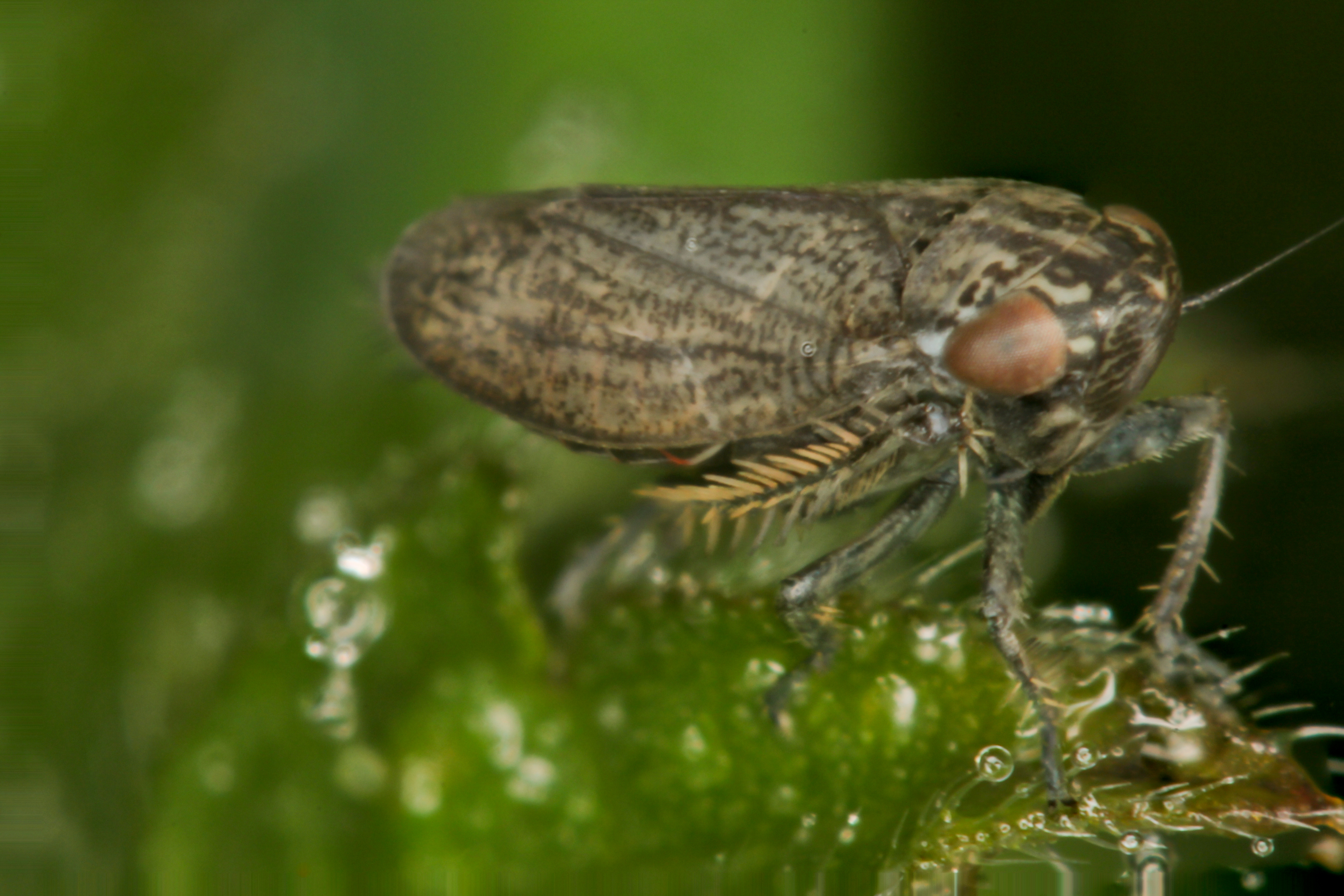

Scientific classification
- Kingdom: Animalia
- Phylum: Arthropoda
- Clade: Pancrustacea
- Class: Insecta
- Order: Hemiptera
- Suborder: Auchenorrhyncha
- Family: Cicadellidae
- Subfamily: Deltocephalinae
- Tribe: Athysanini
- Genus: Euscelis
- Species: E. incisa

Binomial name
- Euscelis incisa (Kirschbaum, 1858)

Synonyms
- Cicada plebeja Fallén, 1806 (Unav.); Cicada plebeius Walker 1851 (Lapsus); Athysanus incisus Kirschbaum 1858; Athysanus obscurellus Kirschbaum 1858; Jassus (Athysanus) pallidior Kirschbaum 1868; Athysanus communis Edwards 1888; Athysanus eomunnis Edwards 1888 (Lapsus); Athysanus plebejus v. fusciventris Rey 1894; Athysanus plebejus v. paradoxus Rey 1894; Athysanus plebeius v. tessellatus Rey 1894; Athysanus plebejus tesselatus Hüber 1904 (Lapsus); Athysanus obsscurellus Bergevin 1913 (Lapsus); Euscelis plebejus v. ochreata Haupt 1927; Euscelis plebeja albingensis Wagner 1939; Euscelis plebeja albigensis Reclaire 1944 (Lapsus); Euscelis superplebejus Müller 1947 (Nom. Nud.); Euscelis subplebejus Müller 1947 (Nom. Nud.); Euscelis galiberti Ribaut 1952; Euscelis pallidor Marchand 1953 (Lapsus); Euscelis plebejus v. aestivalis Müller 1954; Euscelis plebejus v. subplebejus Müller 1954; Euscelis plebejus v. vernalis Müller 1954; Euscelis plebejus v. superplebejus Müller 1954

= Euscelis incisa =

Species of true bug

Euscelis incisa is a leafhopper species in the family Cicadellidae. It is found in Europe, North Africa, and Asia. It is formerly known as Euscelis plebejus, among other names.

== Biology ==
Euscelis incisa can be used as a vector of the bacterium Spiroplasma citri, a mollicute bacterium that is the causative agent of the Citrus stubborn disease, to experimentally infect white clover (Trifolium repens).
