= Euscelis lineolata =

Scientific classification
- Kingdom: Animalia
- Phylum: Arthropoda
- Clade: Pancrustacea
- Class: Insecta
- Order: Hemiptera
- Suborder: Auchenorrhyncha
- Family: Cicadellidae
- Subfamily: Deltocephalinae
- Tribe: Athysanini
- Genus: Euscelis
- Species: E. lineolata

Binomial name
- Euscelis lineolata Brullé, 1832

Synonyms
- Cicada plebeja var. "ß" Fallén, 1806 (Unav.); Aphrodes nitida Curtis, 1829 (Nom. Nud.); Euscelis lineolata Brullé, 1832; Phrynomorphus nitidus Curtis, 1833; Jassus (Athysanus) stictopterus Flor, 1861; Acocephalus agrestis var. "a" Marshall, 1866 (Unav.); Jassus (Athysanus) ochrosomus Kirschbaum, 1868; Athysanus bilunaris Rey, 1894; Athysanus lincolatus Bergevin, 1913 (Lapsus); Euscelis stictopleurus Servadei, 1952 (Lapsus); Euscelis bilobatus Ribaut, 1952

Species of true bug

Euscelis lineolata is a leafhopper species in the family Cicadellidae. It is found in Europe, North Africa, and western Asia.
