= Atrichopogon peregrinus =

Scientific classification
- Domain: Eukaryota
- Kingdom: Animalia
- Phylum: Arthropoda
- Class: Insecta
- Order: Diptera
- Family: Ceratopogonidae
- Genus: Atrichopogon
- Species: A. peregrinus

Binomial name
- Atrichopogon peregrinus (Johannsen, 1908)

Synonyms
- Ceratopogon peregrinus Johannsen, 1908

Species of fly

Atrichopogon peregrinus is a species of biting midges (flies in the family Ceratopogonidae).
