= Atrichopogon levis =

Scientific classification
- Domain: Eukaryota
- Kingdom: Animalia
- Phylum: Arthropoda
- Class: Insecta
- Order: Diptera
- Family: Ceratopogonidae
- Genus: Atrichopogon
- Species: A. levis

Binomial name
- Atrichopogon levis (Coquillett, 1901)

Synonyms
- Ceratopogon exilis Coquillett, 1902; Ceratopogon levis Coquillett, 1901

Species of biting midges in the family Ceratopogonidae

Atrichopogon levis is a species of biting midges in the family Ceratopogonidae.
