= Atrichopogon fusculus =

Scientific classification
- Domain: Eukaryota
- Kingdom: Animalia
- Phylum: Arthropoda
- Class: Insecta
- Order: Diptera
- Family: Ceratopogonidae
- Genus: Atrichopogon
- Species: A. fusculus

Binomial name
- Atrichopogon fusculus (Coquillett, 1901)

Synonyms
- Ceratopogon fusculus Coquillett, 1901

Species of fly

Atrichopogon fusculus is a species of biting midges in the family Ceratopogonidae.
