= Elias E. Manuelidis =

American neuropathologist

Elias Emmanuel Manuelidis
- Born: August 15, 1918; Constantinople, Ottoman Empire
- Died: November 11, 1992 (aged 74); New Haven, Connecticut, United States
- Education: Ludwig-Maximilians-Universität München, M.D. 1942
- Occupations: Physician, neuropathologist
- Years active: 1942 – 1989
- Known for: Research into Creutzfeldt-Jakob disease
- Spouse: Laura Manuelidis
- Children: 2

Elias Emmanuel Manuelidis (15 August 1918 – 11 November 1992) was an American physician and neuropathologist who researched neurological diseases, including polio, Alzheimer's, brain tumors, and Creutzfeldt-Jakob disease. He was the head of neuropathology at Yale University.

== Biography ==
Elias Manuelidis was born on August 15, 1918, in Constantinople, which was then part of the Ottoman Empire. His parents were Ottoman Greeks. His family fled to Athens, Greece as refugees when Manuelidis was four years old. He received his medical degree from the Ludwig-Maximilians-Universität München in 1942. He worked there as a science assistant until 1946, when he took a job in the laboratory at the Max Planck Institute of Psychiatry. In 1950 and 1951, he worked at a U.S. army hospital in Munich as a neuropathologist. He then immigrated to the United States and began work at the Yale School of Medicine.

At Yale, Manuelidis was a professor of pathology. He taught there from 1951 until his retirement in 1989. His research focused on diseases affecting the nervous system. Some of his research interests were Alzheimer's disease, a degenerative disease which causes dementia; polio, an infectious disease that can have long-lasting impacts on the nervous system; and brain tumors. Together with Yale physician Dorothy M. Horstmann, he studied Teschen's disease, a fatal form of encephalomyelitis that affects pigs. He also collaborated with Lucy Balian Rorke-Adams, a pediatric neuropathologist, to study Alper's disease in hamsters.

Manuelidis' particular focus was Creutzfeldt-Jakob disease (CJD), which is caused by infectious protein particles called prions. CJD is neurodegenerative, meaning it slowly damages the brain and nervous system. CJD is fatal. He demonstrated that CJD can be transmitted via tissue or organ transplant. (Note: The Baltimore Sun obituary describes CJD as a viral disease. At the time, prion diseases were poorly understood, and some scientists believed they were caused by viruses.)

Elias Manuelidis and his wife Laura Manuelidis (née Kirchman) did research into prion disease together as Yale faculty. He met Laura Manuelidis, also a doctor and neuropathologist, while she was his student. She graduated from the Yale School of Medicine in 1967. Together, the Manuelidis team conducted research on CJD. In the 1980s, they sampled tissue from forty-six Americans whose deaths had been attributed to Alzheimer's disease. They found that six had actually died of CJD, pointing to the potential for misdiagnosis of the disease. Laura Manuelidis succeeded her husband as the head of neuropathology at Yale upon his death.

In 1983, Elias Manuelidis became the president of the American Association of Neuropathologists.

Manuelidis died in 1992 of a stroke. The Elias E. Manuelidis Memorial Fund Research Grant, which provides funding to Yale students doing research into the history of medicine, is named in his honor.
