= Citrus stubborn disease =

Disease of Citrus plants

- Common names: CSD, citrus stubborn, little leaf disease of citrus, stubborn disease of citrus
- Causal agents: Spiroplasma citri
- Hosts: Sweet orange
- Vectors: Leafhoppers (Circulifer tenellus (beet leafhopper), Scaphytopius nitridus, Circulifer haematoceps)
- EPPO Code: SPIRCI
- Distribution: California and Arizona, Mediterranean region

The Citrus stubborn disease is a plant disease affecting species in the genus Citrus. The causative agent of the agent of the disease is Spiroplasma citri, a Mollicute bacterium species. The bacterium resides in the phloem of the affected plant. Originally discovered in citrus-growing regions of California, S. citri is transmitted by several leafhoppers, including Circulifer tenellus (beet leafhopper) and Scaphytopius nitridus in citrus-growing regions of California. The disease has now spread to Arizona by the same hoppers, and Circulifer haematoceps in the Mediterranean region.

The primary host affected by citrus stubborn disease is the sweet orange, but the bacterium can also infect weeds such as periwinkle (Vinca rosea) and London rocket (Sisymbrium irio). Yellowed plants of Chinese cabbage and pak-choi (Brassica rapa) can be infected by S. citri. In the wild, shortpod mustard (Hirschfeldia incana) infested by the beet leafhopper, Circulifer tenellus, can prove to be an important reservoir of infection. S. citri can also be transmitted to China aster (Callistephus chinensis), Shasta daisy (Leucanthemum × superbum), red clover (Trifolium pratense) and radish (Raphanus sativus) by the leafhopper Scaphytopius nitridus. The bacterium has also been shown to experimentally infect white clover (Trifolium repens) using Euscelis incisa as a vector.

Symptoms on citrus trees are variable but typically include small size with upright position. Fruits harvested from citrus trees with severe symptoms of citrus stubborn disease can be acorn-shaped or lopsided.

== Hosts and symptoms ==
As the name indicates, citrus stubborn disease affects citrus plants, most severely oranges (especially naval and mandarin varieties), grapefruit, and tangelo trees. Lemon and lime are also affected, but much less severely. CSD is an unusual case of a plant disease shared between a vector, weed, and unrelated crop.

Symptoms of Citrus Stubborn disease are most prominent in immature plants but still appear on established trees. The primary symptom of Citrus Stubborn disease is the irregularity of fruit on the same tree. A tree with citrus stubborn disease will have fruits of differing sizes, shapes, and stages of maturity and typically lighter, smaller fruits than its healthy counterpart. Affected fruits will often drop prior to maturity and often have a characteristic acorn-like shape, which is easily seen by cutting the fruit in half. Coloration of the fruit is also affected. The blossom end remains green while the stem end is colored in affected fruits. Farmers would most readily use these symptoms as indicators that their crop may have been infected with Spiroplasma citri.

On leaves, Spiroplasma citri manifests itself as light mottling similar to that of nutrient deficiency and a more vertical orientation. Another indication of infection is bunchy growth caused by shortened internodes. Healthy plants will have comparably more outstretched branches and a rounded appearance. A tree with Citrus Stubborn Disease will have a very low yield and the fruit it does yield will not be comparable to a healthy fruit. Small leaves and upright, bunchy growth of branches is common in infected plants, as is dieback and leaf drop. However, Citrus stubborn does not affect canopy height, width, trunk diameter, and juice quality, regardless of the severity of the infection.

Diagnosis can be difficult because the disease is not often severe enough to produce outwardly apparent symptoms. In addition, when it is evident that a tree is diseased, the symptoms are very common and could be attributed to numerous other pathogens or environmental factors. To truly confirm the presence of Spiroplasma citri it must be detected by PCR or a tissue culture with spiroplasmas must be produced. It has been shown that PCR is the most effective diagnostic tool for citrus stubborn disease.

== Importance ==
Temperate regions with limited seasonal rainfall, like in central California, Arizona, and the Mediterranean, are most affected by Citrus Stubborn disease. California is the number one producer of fresh citrus fruit in the United States making citrus stubborn disease in this region an economically important disease for control. Citrus stubborn initially rose to a major concern for the citrus industry in the 1980s and is, in recent years, becoming an increasingly problematic disease.

Trees severely affected by citrus stubborn disease have been shown to have reduced fruit production by 45-52%, as compared with their undiseased counterparts. In addition, fruits produced by these trees have an 8-15% reduction in diameter. This decrease in yield is very problematic if the fruit was intended for juice production as well as the marketability of the fruit itself.

While studies have reported different finding regarding juice quality, there seems to be a greater likelihood for the juice of citrus stubborn affected fruits to have a high citric acid concentration, making it too sour for use. The mishappen and discolored fruit is unfavorable among consumers, making severely affected fruits unusable.

While not entirely quantifiable on a market scale, citrus stubborn disease causes significant enough problems to be a concern for citrus growers in terms of productivity and marketability.

== Management ==
The most effective way to prevent citrus stubborn disease is to prevent Spiroplasma citri from reaching and infecting young, susceptible plants. This is best achieved through a variety of cultural practices.

Spiroplasma citri is transmissible through several insect vectors, namely the beet leafhopper. One effective measure against the beet leafhopper is planting trap plants, such as sugar beets, that the insect vector favor but are not susceptible to citrus stubborn disease nearby, in attempt to draw the disease-carrying insects away from the citrus plants. To further increase the effectiveness a chemical component can be added by spraying insecticides on the trap plants, eliminating the insect vector and preventing the bacteria from reaching the citrus crop.

Older trees are much less susceptible to Spiroplasma citri, so it is most critical to be diligent in preventing infection while the tree is still maturing. Trees under 6 years old that have citrus stubborn disease should be completely removed, as they will never be productive, and infected trees older than 6 should be individually evaluated and either have symptomatic parts removed or be completely replaced with a healthy plant.

Citrus stubborn disease can be spread through grafting, so it is important to ensure that the mother tree is free of Spiroplasma citri before propagation. Also, trees should be obtained, if possible from areas where Spiroplasma citri is not viable to prevent bringing the pathogen into an orchard.

In addition, it is important to closely monitor the weeds in young orchards to ensure that they are not susceptible to Spiroplasma citri, and if susceptible ones appear, to remove them as soon as possible.

== See also ==
- List of citrus diseases
- Corn stunt disease
