= Resource Directory Description Language =

Resource Directory Description Language (RDDL) is an extension of XHTML Basic 1.0. An RDDL document, called a Resource Directory, provides a package of information about some target. The targets which RDDL was designed to describe are XML namespaces. The specification for RDDL has no official standing and has not been considered nor approved by any organization (e.g., W3C).

RDDL is designed to allow both human readers and software robots to find any sort of resource associated with a particular namespace. Instead of putting one thing at the end of a namespace URI, RDDL puts a document there that lists all the machine-processable documents that might be available, including:

- Document Type Definitions (DTD)
- XML schemas in a variety of languages (including RELAX, Schematron, W3C XML Schema, TREX, and others)
- Cascading Style Sheets, XSLT, and other style sheet specifications
- Specification documents

== rddl:resource ==
An RDDL document identifies each related resource by a resource element in the http://www.rddl.org/ namespace, which is customarily mapped to the rddl prefix. This element is a simple XLink (that is, it has an xlink:type attribute with the value simple) and its xlink:href attribute points to the related resource. Furthermore, the xlink:role attribute identifies the nature of the related resource and the optional xlink:arcrole attribute identifies the purpose of the related resource. An optional xlink:title attribute can provide a brief description of the purpose of the link.
