= Spiroplasma citri =

Scientific classification
- Domain: Bacteria
- Kingdom: Bacillati
- Phylum: Mycoplasmatota
- Class: Mollicutes
- Order: Mycoplasmatales
- Family: Spiroplasmataceae
- Genus: Spiroplasma
- Species: S. citri

Binomial name
- Spiroplasma citri Saglio et al. 1973 (Approved Lists 1980)

Species of bacterium

Spiroplasma citri is a bacterium species and the causative agent of Citrus stubborn disease.

Its genome has been partially sequenced.

The restriction enzyme SciNI, with the cutting site 5' GCGC / 3' CGCG, can be found in S. citri.

Euscelis incisa can be used as a vector of the bacterium to experimentally infect white clover (Trifolium repens).

Spiroplasma citri is a partially sequenced, Gram-positive plant pathogenic mollicute which has a wide host range.

== Taxonomy and phylogeny ==
Spiroplasma citri is a bacteria that belongs to the kingdom Bacteria, phylum Tenericutes, class Mollicutes, order Entomoplasmatales, family Spiroplasmataceae, and genus Spiroplasma. Members of the Mollicutes class, such as Spiroplasma, are characterized by their reduced genomes and lack of a conventional cell wall, which is a result of their adaptation to parasitic or symbiotic lifestyles. Although Spiroplasma, Mycoplasma, and Phytoplasma are all under the Mollicutes class, the Spiroplasma genus demonstrates a closer genetic relationship to Mycoplasma, an animal genus causing disease, than to Phytoplasma, a plant-associated genus, as only Spiroplasma and Mycoplasma can import sugars through the phosphotransferase system and make ATP via ATP synthase, and Spiroplasma genomes are 1 Mbp larger than Phytoplasma genomes. Most mollicutes are obligate pathogens or symbionts forming complex relationships with their hosts. Notably, Spiroplasma and Phytoplasma exhibit complex life cycles associated with both insect and plant hosts. Spiroplasma transfers between plants and insects through feeding, reflecting its dependency on both host types for survival and spread. This taxonomic affiliation places S. citri within the Citri-Chrysopicola-Mirum clade; relevant neighboring species within this genus include S. kunkelii, S. phoeniceum, S. eriocheiris, S. melliferum, and S. penaei, which infect a variety of hosts including specific species of corn, periwinkles, shrimps, crabs, and honeybees.

== Discovery and isolation ==
Around 1915, “Washington” navel trees near Redlands, California, were the first to show symptoms of what is now known as Citrus Stubborn Disease. The disease was then reported outside of California for the first time in the Mediterranean in 1928, suggesting its wider geographical spread and impact on citrus production by that time. However, S. citri, the bacterium responsible for Citrus stubborn disease, was not cultured and identified until 1973 in California. This identification was made by J. M. Bové, P. Saglio, M. Lhospital, D. Lafléche, G. Dupont, J. G. Tully, and E. A. Freundt. This team of scientists aimed to find the root cause of citrus stubborn disease, responsible for stunting the growth of citrus plants. The research team focused on young citrus leaves from plants because they were more likely to transmit the disease. To culture S. citri, the team used specialized nutrient-rich media that included horse serum or cholesterol, essential for growth, which mimicked the intracellular environment of the plant phloem, facilitating the growth of this bacterium. The cultures were maintained under anaerobic conditions to replicate the low-oxygen environment inside host issues. The scientists learned the unique biochemical properties of S. citri and what characteristics distinguished it as its own species.

== Morphology ==
Spiroplasma citri belongs to the Spiroplasma genus within the Mollicutes class, which is composed of Gram-positive bacteria that lack a cell wall. S. citri typically has a helical structure due to the arrangement of fibril and MreB filaments along its cytoskeleton. In its helical form, S. citri moves in a corkscrew motion, which plays a significant role in cell division and elongation. However, its alternate forms—spherical or ovoid shapes and branches, non-helical filaments—use intracellular fibril filaments for motility, compensating for the absence of flagella. These filaments create kinks in the cell body, allowing S. citri to move. The sizes of these forms vary greatly: spherical shapes measure 100 to 240 nanometers wide, while helical and branched nonhelical filaments are about 120 nanometers wide, and 2-4 micrometers long, with the potential to reach 15 micrometers in later growth stages. When cultured on agar, S. citri colonies are around 0.2 millimeters in width and display either a fried-egg-like or granular appearance.

== Metabolism and physiology ==
The metabolic pathways of S. citri allow it to survive and proliferate within citrus plants. The tricarboxylic acid cycle is missing from S. citri which means that this bacterium predominantly relies on glycolysis for ATP production. S. citri has a reduced genome and lacks various metabolic pathways which explains its heavy dependence on its hosts for nutrients, including amino acids, sugars, nucleotides, and vitamins. It lacks a cell wall and is unable to make fatty acids. However, it can modify host-derived lipids for its membrane structure. Like other Spiroplasma species, S. citri is an auxotroph for most of the necessary amino acids, meaning that it obtains them from the host. Spiroplasmas in general are more metabolically flexible which allow them to easily adapt to different environments. In the case of S. citri, this is typically inside an insect or plant phloem. S. citri has virulence factors involved in host tissue degradation and evasion of host immune responses.

== Genomics ==
Spiroplasma citri's genome was pieced together through shotgun and chromosome-specific library sequencing of its 1820 kbp chromosome. Although only 92% of the genome was sequenced, scientists were able to uncover phage-related sequences, 69 transposase copies, and an almost complete terpenoid biosynthetic pathway. Functional complementation and gene inactivation studies demonstrated that S. citri fructose consumption induces plant disease symptoms, and the ABC-type transporter solute binding protein is implicated in insect transmission. The genome includes seven plasmids (10-14 copies/cell) containing proteins for DNA transfer. However, gene decay, observed through shortened coding sequences and incomplete housekeeping genes, as well as repeated sequences, which hinder full chromosome sequencing, indicate the complexity of the genome.

== Ecology ==
S. citri is mainly transmitted by leafhoppers, which spread the bacterium from infected to healthy citrus plants through feeding habits. Young citrus plants are more susceptible to infection because they are more attractive to leafhoppers, whereas older plants become less appealing to these insects. Once within the plant, S. citri exploits the nutrients of host plants to survive and reproduce. It primarily resides in the plant phloem, a tissue that is particularly nutrient-rich because it is responsible for transportation of sugars. S. citri thrives and spreads in hot, dry weather, making it commonly found in the United States, the Middle East, North Africa, Central America, New Zealand, and part of Western Europe, particularly France, Italy, and Spain. Notably, in California, major citrus plants like oranges, grapefruits, and tangelos suffer notable yield losses due to S. citri infection, impacting 5-10% of trees.

=== Environmental Impact ===
Spiroplasma citri causes citrus stubborn disease, a disease that reduces the yield and quality of citrus fruits. S. citri also infects other essential crops, including tomatoes, lettuce, and carrots, which directly impacts the profitability of the agricultural industry and disrupts the food supply.
