= Slow virus =

A slow virus is a virus, or a viruslike agent, etiologically associated with a slow virus disease. A slow virus disease is a disease that, after an extended period of latency, follows a slow, progressive course spanning months to years, frequently involves the central nervous system, and in most cases progresses to death. Examples of slow virus diseases include HIV/AIDS, caused by the HIV virus, subacute sclerosing panencephalitis, the rare result of a measles virus infection, and Paget's disease of bone (osteitis deformans), which may be associated with paramyxoviruses, especially the measles virus and the human respiratory syncytial virus.

== Characteristics ==
Every infectious agent is different, but in general, slow viruses:

- Cause an asymptomatic primary infection
- Have a long incubation period ranging from months to years
- Follow a slow but relentless progressive course leading to death
- Tend to have a genetic predisposition
- Often re-emerge from latency if the host becomes immuno-compromised

Additionally, the immune system seems to plays a limited role, or no role, in protection from many of these slow viruses. This may be due to the slow replication rates some of these agents exhibit, preexisting immunosuppression (as in the cases of JC virus and BK virus), or, in the case of prions, the identity of the agent involved.

== Scope ==
Slow viruses cause a variety of diseases, including cancer.

Examples of viral agents
Virus	Virus family	Disease	Typical latency	Transmitted by
JC virus (Human polyomavirus 2)	Polyomavirus	Progressive multifocal leukoencephalopathy	Years to Life^{§}	Unknown; possibly contaminated water
BK virus	Polyomavirus	BK nephropathy, bladder cancer	Years to life^{§}	Unknown; possibly respiratory spread/urine; possibly contaminated water
Measles virus	Paramyxovirus	Subacute sclerosing panencephalitis	1–10 years	Respiratory droplets
Rubella virus	Togaviridae	Progressive rubella panencephalitis	10–20 years	Respiratory droplets
Rabies virus	Rhabdoviridae	Rabies	3–12 weeks	Bite of an infected animal
Human papillomavirus infection	Papillomaviridae	Cancers of the cervix, oropharynx, vulva, anal, penis, vagina and rectum.	Years	Sexual activity

^{§}JC virus & BK virus only cause disease in immunocompromised patients

== See also ==
- Clinical latency
- Virus latency
