= Corn stunt disease =

Bacterial plant disease

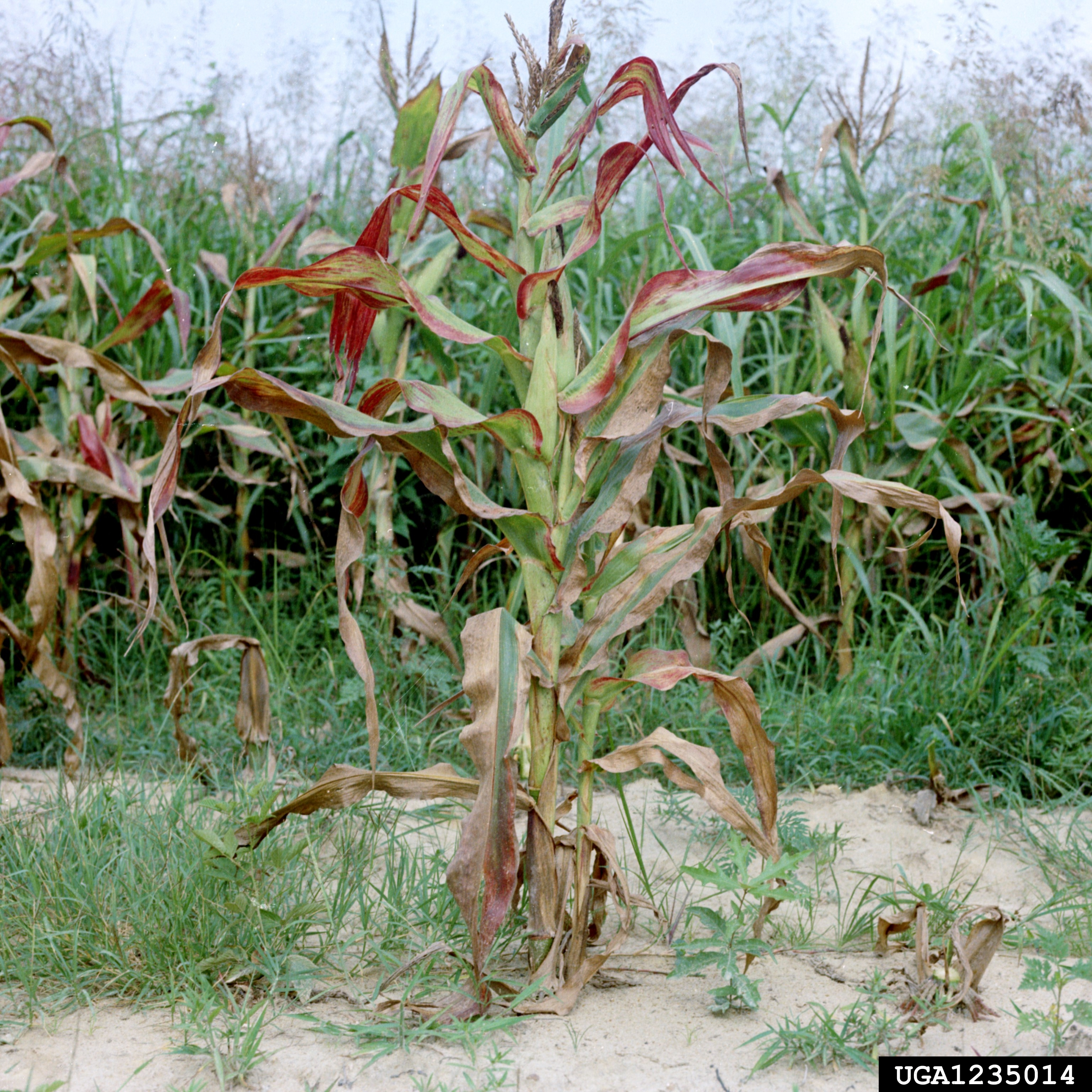
Corn Stunt whole plant

Corn stunt disease is a bacterial disease of corn and other grasses. Symptoms include stunted growth and leaves turning red. It is caused by the bacterium Spiroplasma kunkelii.

== Disease cycle ==
S. kunkelii, a spiroplasma often referred to as corn stunt spiroplasma, can survive and overwinter in the maize leafhopper (Dalbulus maidis), which infects corn plants in the spring and causes corn stunt disease. It has been reported in the San Joaquin Valley in California that volunteer plants are critical to help leafhoppers survive in the winter, where volunteer plants can give an extra two months of season to the leafhoppers. This pathogen has been described as propagative persistent and circulative, accumulating and replicating in the vector where it has been found in the hemolymph, cells of the gut, and salivary glands of insect vectors. During feeding it is delivered to the phloem tissue of the host corn plant.

There is an important relationship that S. kunkelii has with D. maidis, where its survival over the winter depends on the survival of the leafhopper. This relationship may also be beneficial for D. maidis. When Dalbulus leafhoppers are infected with S. kunkelii, it has been reported that fertility and life-expectancy are diminished. However, specific to D. maidis, one study suggests that the presence of S. kunkelii increases chances of D. maidis survival in colder weather, specifically 10–20 degrees Celsius, when either given oats or lived on moist sand, although this effect on survival was not found to be true in the case of freezing temperatures. Similarly, one group suggests that the spiroplasma may provide useful metabolites for its leafhopper vector.

S. Kunkelii can be transmitted by other leafhopper genera, however the leafhopper D. maidis is of most significance in Latin America.

== Management ==
The most effective way to control corn stunt is early planting. Although corn stunt can impact corn planted in early months like April or March, the greatest damage affects corn planted after July. Chemicals like insecticides can be used to control D. maidis, however, the use of this method to control Corn Stunt is not very successful. In sweet corn, reflective mulches can be an effective way to control D. maidis and the disease it vectors, compared to insecticides. Mulching should be performed early in the plant's development to properly control this disease, as greater damage happens if the plant host is younger when infected with corn stunt disease. Although D. maidis is the major vector for S. kunkelii, one study calls for a focus on all vectors that can transmit corn stunt disease, since, in addition to D. maidis, three other species of Dalbulus are able to spread and carry corn stunt spiroplasma.

== Importance ==
S. kunkelii, the corn stunt spiroplasma, was characterized as the causative agent of corn stunt disease by Whitcomb et al. in 1986. In the literature, the combination of maize bushy stunt mycoplasma and maize rayado fino marafivirus in addition to S. kunkelii has been called the corn stunt disease complex, also called "achaparramiento." The combination of these diseases is devastating and all of these can be transmitted by D. maidis. Because of the pathogens and it can transmit, D. maidis is of great financial importance in Latin America. Also, maize chlorotic dwarf virus has also been reported to be implicated in corn stunt disease. When corn stunt spiroplasma and maize bushy stunt mycoplasma may co-occur, the disease that they can cause has been referred to as "puca poncho" due to its red coloring of the diseased maize. Different combinations of these pathogens are notably present and cause serious problems in yield production in Central America, reported in Nicaragua, Peru, and Argentina, and the southern part of the United States, where it was reported in California and Florida. Despite the common co-occurrence with other causative agents, S. kunkelii is the most prevalent in the subtropics as the causative agent of corn stunt disease and can be quite devastating.
