= Virino =

Hypothetical infectious particle

The virino is a hypothetical infectious particle once theorized to be the cause of scrapie and other degenerative diseases of the central nervous system. It was thought to consist of nucleic acids within a protective coat of host cell proteins. The hypothesis was never widely accepted, and the causative agents responsible for these diseases are now widely accepted to be prions.

== Origin of the concept ==
The virino was described partially to protect the central dogma of molecular biology, which was threatened by the existence of a series of degenerative neurological TSE diseases including kuru, CJD, scrapie in sheep, and BSE in cattle. The central dogma states that nucleic acids act as information carriers, and DNA and RNA make proteins. Proteins alone cannot make DNA. However, studies searching for the transmission agent of scrapie and other TSEs failed to culture bacteria, and tests attacking nucleic acids strands have little effect on the infectivity of TSE solutions. These failures largely rule out a virus as the infective agent. Experiments using electron beams designed to disrupt large molecules have been performed to investigate the size of the agent show that it is very small: much smaller than the smallest known virus.

The virino also has the benefit of explaining the traits of TSEs which resemble nucleic acids: for example, their occurrence in strains, which positively indicates the TSE agent is information carrying, and not merely a toxin.

== History of description ==
In 1971, Dickinson, AG and Meikle, VM provided a hypothesis for the replication of the scrapie agent. This hypothesis was based on the discovery of a single autosomal gene controlling the scrapie incubation period in mice and on observations about strains of the scrapie agent. They dubbed the gene sinc for scrapie incubator. This hypothesis proposed that the gene products of each sinc allele contributed to a multimeric protein structure, which then formed a 'replication site' for the scrapie agent. The replication of the agent would depend on how the particular strain interacted with the replication site and of what the site was composed. The fact that different strains of scrapie were known had suggested the agent was similar to conventional viruses in that it carried a genome composed of nucleic acids. Thus, variants could arise during incubation, giving rise to new strains. No host-encoded properties were found to determine scrapie agent strain differences. This was thought to prove that the genome of the agent could vary independently and, although replicated by normal host mechanisms, was not coded by the host. The term 'virino' was coined to reflect the small size, immunological neutrality, and virus-like nature of the infectious particles.

Thus, in the nucleotide model proposed by Dickinson, AG, and Outram, GW in 1979, the lifecycle of the scrapie agent included a stage where the genome was bound to host protein, probably a multimeric protein complex, derived from the sinc gene. Recalling Enrico Fermi's word play on a neutron-like particle, Outram coined the term 'virino' to describe a small virus. In the virino model, the host protein protects the scrapie agent nucleic acids from degradation and prevents the host from raising an immune response, since the protein/nucleic acid complex is seen as a legitimate part of the host. However, the presumed scrapie-associated nucleic acid has not been identified, and physical or chemical evidence for its presence is lacking.
