= Atrichopogon =

- Atrichopogon sp. on Oedemera virescens

Scientific classification
- Kingdom: Animalia
- Phylum: Arthropoda
- Class: Insecta
- Order: Diptera
- Family: Ceratopogonidae
- Subfamily: Forcipomyiinae
- Genus: Atrichopogon; Kieffer, 1906

Species
- See list

Genus of flies

Atrichopogon is a genus of biting midges, small flies in the family Ceratopogonidae.

Some Atrichopogon (and Forcipomyia) species are ectoparasites on larger insects.
