= Genetics of synesthesia =

The genetic mechanism of synesthesia has long been debated, with researchers previously claiming it was a single X-linked trait due to seemingly higher prevalence in women and no evidence of male-male transmission This is where the only synesthetic parent is male and the male child has synesthesia, meaning that the trait cannot be solely linked to the X chromosome.

The Mendelian nature of the trait was further disproven when case studies showed that the Phenotype of synesthesia could be differentially expressed in monozygotic (genotypically identical) twins While both twins had the same genome with the potential for phenotypic expression of synesthesia, only one had documented synesthesia. Therefore, the condition is now thought to be oligogenic, with Locus heterogeneity and multiple forms of inheritance, and expression, implying that synesthesia is determined by more than one gene, more than one location in those genes, and a complex mode of inheritance. Several full genome linkage scans have shown particular areas of the genome whose inheritance seem to correlate with the inheritance of synesthesia.

Using the LOD score which describes the likelihood that two genes are near each other on a chromosome, and thus will be inherited together, areas of strong or suggestive linkage with inheritance of synesthesia were found. The area with the highest LOD score in the genome of an individual with auditory-visual synesthesia has been shown to be linked with autism as well, another disorder with sensory and perceptual abnormalities. Other regions of linkage include genes that are related to the development of the cerebral cortex (TBR1), dyslexia, and apoptosis (EFHC1), the last of which could be potentially related to the retention of the neonatal synesthetic pathways in the universal synesthesia/pruning hypothesis. This hypothesis posits that every person is born a synesthete and the ‘extra’ connections are pruned during normal neurodevelopment in non-synesthetes, and not pruned in synesthetes.

More potential support for that hypothesis comes from another region identified with strong linkage, which contains a gene (DPYSL3) which is involved in axonal growth, neuroplasticity, and neuronal differentiation. Additionally, this gene is not expressed in the adult brain but is highly expressed in the late-fetal and early post-natal brain and spinal cord, providing more support for a universal “neonatal synesthesia” that is pruned away through natural development.

Another genome scan revealed a different area of linkage for an individual with colored sequence synesthesia: one which associates days of the week with colors. In that individual, the linked region contained genes that produces proteins important for intercellular communication (GABARAPL2), genes that are involved in brain development (NDRG4), genes linked to neuron myelination (PLLP), genes that produce enzymes involved in neuronal pruning (KATNB1), genes that produce Apoptosis inhibitors expressed in fetal brains (CIAPIN1), and genes that produce proteins that have differential expression in individuals with schizophrenia (GNAO1).

Due to the prevalence of synesthesia among the first-degree relatives of synesthetes, there is evidence that synesthesia might have a genetic basis, however the monozygotic twins case studies indicate there is an epigenetic component. Synesthesia might also be an oligogenic condition, with Locus heterogeneity, multiple forms of inheritance (including Mendelian in some cases), and continuous variation in gene expression.

== See also ==
- Synesthesia
