= Fatal insomnia =

Prion disease of the human brain

Fatal Insomnia
- Other names: Thalamic Creutzfeldt-Jakob disease
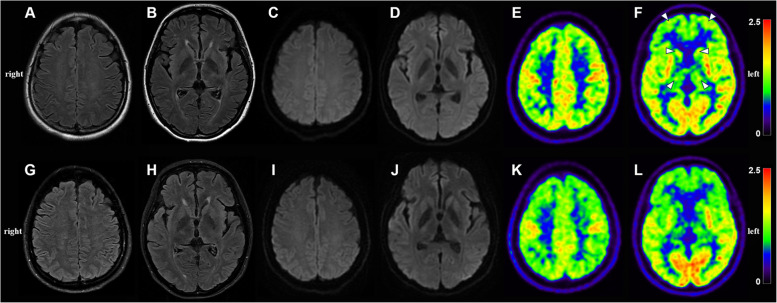
- Longitudinal comparison of 18F-FDG PET/MRI in brain in a patient with fatal insomnia, demonstrating normal brain parenchyma on MRI, but prominent hypometabolism of the thalamus. The top row of images shows baseline brain scans of the patient; the bottom row shows follow-up brain scans taken three and a half months later. A,B and G,H show MRI-FLAIR; C,D and I,J show DWI; E,F and K,L show fusion imaging (T1WI and SUVR map of 18F-FDG PET).
- Specialty: Neurology, psychiatry, sleep medicine, neuropathology
- Symptoms: Progressive insomnia, ataxia, double vision, cachexia, high blood pressure, excessive sweating, fever, agrypnia excitata, panic attacks, dementia, delusions, phobias, tachycardia, vivid dreams
- Complications: Permanent state of hypnagogia later in the illness, heart attack
- Usual onset: 45–50 years old
- Duration: 18 months (average)
- Types: Fatal familial insomnia, sporadic fatal insomnia
- Causes: PrP^{CJD} type 2 (Genetic mutation (fCJD D178N-129MM/MV), sporadic form (sCJDMM2-T, very rare))
- Risk factors: Family history
- Diagnostic method: Suspected based on symptoms, supported by sleep study, PET scan and genetic testing (if familial form is suspected)
- Differential diagnosis: Creutzfeldt-Jakob disease, Morvan's syndrome
- Prevention: Gene editing of children at risk
- Treatment: Supportive care
- Medication: None
- Prognosis: Invariably fatal
- Frequency: 70 families worldwide are known to carry the gene associated with the disease, 37 sporadic cases diagnosed (as of 20 September 2022)
- Deaths: <1 per year

Fatal insomnia is a neurodegenerative prion disease that results in trouble sleeping as its hallmark symptom. The majority of cases are familial (fatal familial insomnia [FFI]), stemming from a mutation in the PRNP gene, with the remainder of cases occurring sporadically (sporadic fatal insomnia [sFI]). The problems with sleeping typically start out gradually and worsen over time. Eventually, the patient will succumb to total insomnia (agrypnia excitata), most often leading to other symptoms such as speech problems, coordination problems, and dementia. It results in death within a few months to a few years, and there is currently no known disease-modifying treatment.

== Signs and symptoms ==
The disease has four stages:

1. Characterized by worsening insomnia, resulting in panic attacks, paranoia, and phobias. This stage lasts for about four months.
2. Hallucinations and panic attacks become noticeable, continuing for about five months.
3. Complete inability to sleep followed by rapid loss of weight. This lasts for about three months.
4. Dementia, during which the person becomes unresponsive or mute over the course of six months, is the final stage of the disease, followed by death.

Other symptoms include profuse sweating, miosis (pinpoint pupils), sudden entrance into menopause or impotence, neck stiffness, and elevation of blood pressure and heart rate. The sporadic form of the disease often presents with double vision. Prolonged constipation is common as well. As the disease progresses, the person becomes stuck in a state of pre-sleep limbo, or hypnagogia, which is the state just before sleep in healthy individuals. During these stages, people commonly and repeatedly move their limbs as if they were dreaming.

The age of onset is variable, ranging from 13 to 60 years, with an average of 50. The disease can be detected prior to onset by genetic testing. Death usually occurs between 6–36 months from onset. The presentation of the disease varies considerably from person to person, even among people within the same family; in the sporadic form, for example, sleep problems are not commonly reported, and early symptoms are ataxia, cognitive impairment, and double vision.

== Cause ==
Idiogram of chromosome 20 showing gene PRP location

Fatal familial insomnia is a rare hereditary prion disease that is associated with a mutation in PRNP. The gene, which provides instructions for making the prion protein PrP^{C}, is located on the short arm of chromosome 20 at position p13. Individuals with FFI or familial Creutzfeldt–Jakob disease (fCJD) both carry a mutation at codon 178 of the prion protein gene. FFI is also invariably linked to the presence of the methionine codon at position 129 of the mutant allele, whereas fCJD is linked to the presence of the valine codon at that position. The disease occurs when there is a change of amino acid at position 178 in which asparagine is found instead of the normal aspartic acid.

FFI is an autosomal dominant disease caused by a missense GAC-to-AAC mutation at codon 178 of the PRNP prion protein gene located on chromosome 20, along with the presence of the methionine polymorphism at position 129 of the mutant allele. Pathologically, FFI is characterized predominantly by thalamic degeneration—especially in the medio-dorsal and anteroventral nuclei. Phenotypic variability is a perplexing feature of FFI.

== Pathophysiology ==
In itself the presence of prions causes reduced glucose to be used by the thalamus and a mild hypo-metabolism of the cingulate cortex. The extent of this symptom varies between two variations of the disease: those presenting methionine homozygotes at codon 129 and methionine/valine heterozygotes, with some evidence that hypo-metabolism is more severe in the latter. Given the relationship between the involvement of the thalamus in regulating sleep and alertness, a causal relationship can be drawn and is often mentioned as the cause of insomnia.

== Diagnosis ==
The real-time quaking-induced conversion (RT-QuIC), a highly sensitive assay that detects minute amounts of PrP^{Sc} in the cerebrospinal fluid, has been reported to have a sensitivity of 50% in FFI and sFI.

A test that measures the cerebral metabolic rate of glucose is performed by positron emission tomography (PET), using the radiotracer [18F]-FDG-PET which is a glucose analogue, Fatal Familial Insomnia has demonstrated severe hypometabolism of the thalamus bilaterally in FFI and sFI, also in the earliest stages of the disease. The hypometabolism would show a build up of glucose due to the thalamus using less glucose then normal, this would also align with symptoms of insomnia like sleep regulation, autonomic and cognitive functions and motor information. This hypometabolism then spreads as the disease progresses/worsens, eventually impacting most cortical regions, like cortex, basal ganglia, brainstem and others.

=== Differential diagnosis ===
Other diseases involving the mammalian prion protein are known.

== Treatments ==
Treatment involves palliative care. There is conflicting evidence over the use of sleeping pills, including barbiturates, as a treatment for the disease.

Clonazepam may be prescribed to treat muscle spasms, and eszopiclone or zolpidem may be prescribed to help treat insomnia. However, these drugs do not work in the long term.

== Prognosis ==
Timeline of a fatal familial insomnia (FFI) patient

Like all prion diseases, FFI is invariably fatal. Life expectancy ranges from seven months to six years, with an average of 18 months.

== Epidemiology and history ==
Hypnogram comparing the sleep pattern of a healthy control with five FFI patients, who display decreased sleep efficiency and disrupted sleep cycles (W: wake; R: REM; N1-3: NREM sleep stages.)

Fatal insomnia was first described by Elio Lugaresi et al. in 1986.

In 1998, 40 families were known to carry the gene for FFI globally: eight German, five Italian, four American, two French, two Australian, two British, one Japanese and one Austrian. In the Basque Country of Spain, 16 family cases of the 178N mutation were seen between 1993 and 2005 related to two families with a common ancestor in the 18th century. In 2011, another family was added to the list when researchers found the first man in the Netherlands to be diagnosed with FFI. Whilst he had lived in the Netherlands for 19 years, he was of Egyptian descent. Other prion diseases are similar to FFI and may be related but are missing the D178N gene mutation.

As of 20 September 2022, 37 cases of sporadic fatal insomnia have been diagnosed. Unlike in FFI, those with sFI do not have the D178N mutation in the PRNP gene; they all have a different mutation in the same gene causing methionine homozygosity at codon 129. Nonetheless, the methionine presence in lieu of the valine (Val129) is what causes the sporadic form of disease. The targeting of this mutation has been suggested as a strategy for treatment, or possibly as a cure for the disease.

=== Silvano, 1983, Bologna, Italy ===
In late 1983, Italian neurologist/sleep expert Dr. Ignazio Roiter received a patient at the University of Bologna hospital's sleep institute. The man, known only as Silvano, decided in a rare moment of consciousness to be recorded for future studies and to donate his brain for research in hopes of finding a cure for future victims.

In 1986, Lugaresi and colleagues first named and described in detail the clinical and histopathological features of fatal familial insomnia. This report was primarily based on the aforementioned Silvano. Dr. Roiter referred the case to Prof. Elio Lugaresi, a well-known sleep expert, who, along with his colleagues, carried out advanced sleep analyses. As Silvano's condition quickly deteriorated, Lugaresi arranged for a postmortem neuropathological examination of the brain to be carried out by Dr. Gambetti, Lugaresi's former trainee. The collaboration of these two groups led to the 1986 publication. At the time, a prion disease was not suspected due to a lack of prion-related histopathology and frozen brain tissue for advanced analysis. However, due to the devotion of Dr. Roiter and Silvano's family, more cases were obtained, resulting in the classification of FFI as a familial prion disease tied to the 178Asn genetic mutation.

=== Unnamed American patient, 2001 ===
In an article published in 2006, Schenkein and Montagna wrote of a 52-year-old American man who was able to exceed the average survival time by nearly one year with various strategies that included vitamin therapy and meditation, different stimulants and hypnotics and even complete sensory deprivation in an attempt to induce sleep at night and increase alertness during the day. He managed to write a book and drive hundreds of miles in this time, but nonetheless, over the course of his trials, the man succumbed to the classic four-stage progression of the illness.

=== Egyptian man, 2011, Netherlands ===
In 2011, the first reported case in the Netherlands was of a 57-year-old man of Egyptian descent. The man came in with symptoms of double vision and progressive memory loss, and his family also noted he had recently become disoriented, paranoid and confused. Whilst he tended to fall asleep at random during daily activities, he experienced vivid dreams and random muscular jerks during normal slow-wave sleep. After four months of these symptoms, he began to have convulsions in his hands, trunk and lower limbs while awake. The person died at age 58, seven months after the onset of symptoms. An autopsy revealed mild atrophy of the frontal cortex and moderate atrophy of the thalamus. The latter is one of the most common signs of FFI.

== Research ==
Still with unclear benefit in humans, a number of treatments have had tentative success in slowing disease progression in animal models, including pentosan polysulfate, mepacrine, and amphotericin B. As of 2016, a study investigating doxycycline is being carried out.

In 2009, a mouse model was made for FFI. These mice expressed a humanized version of the PrP protein that also contains the D178N FFI mutation. These mice appear to have progressively fewer and shorter periods of uninterrupted sleep, damage in the thalamus, and early deaths, similar to humans with FFI.

The Prion Alliance was established by husband and wife duo Eric Minikel and Sonia Vallabh after Vallabh's mother was diagnosed with the fatal disease. They conduct research at the Broad Institute to develop therapeutics for human prion diseases. Their hypothesis is that lowering PrP-levels may prevent the onset of FFI. Other research interests involve identifying biomarkers to track the progression of prion disease in living people.
