= Expressivity (genetics) =

Degree to which a phenotype is expressed

In genetics, expressivity is the degree to which a phenotype is expressed by individuals having a particular genotype. Alternatively, it may refer to the expression of a particular gene by individuals having a certain phenotype. Expressivity is related to the intensity of a given phenotype; it differs from penetrance, which refers to the proportion of individuals with a particular genotype that share the same phenotype.

== Variable expressivity ==
Variable expressivity refers to the phenomenon by which individuals with a shared genotype exhibit varying phenotypes. This can be further described as a spectrum of associated traits that can range in size, colour, intensity, and so forth. Variable expressivity can be seen in plants and animals, such as differences in hair colour, leaf size, and severity of diseases.

== Mechanisms influencing expressivity ==
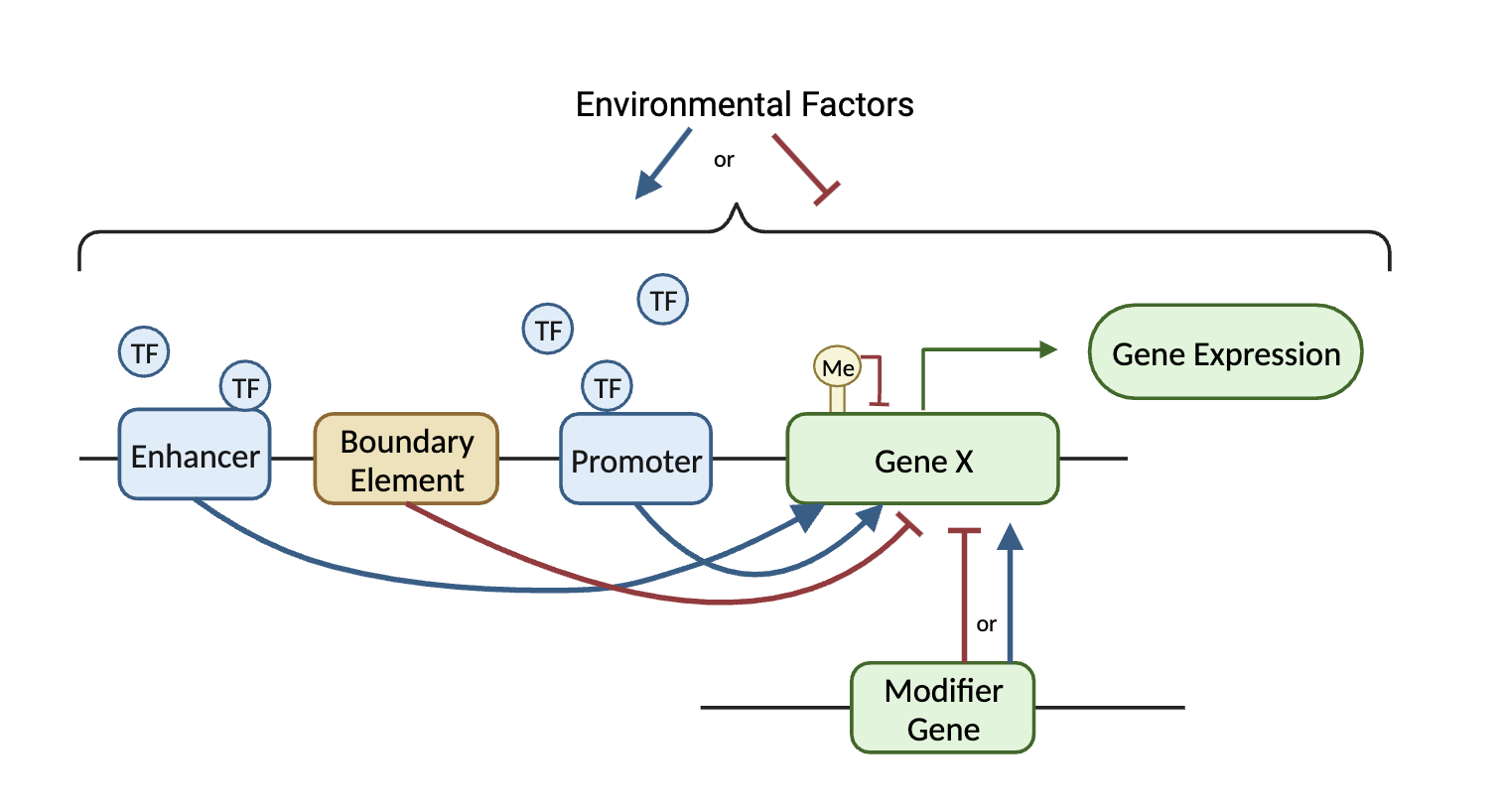
Figure 1. This figure illustrates some factors influencing gene expressivity including cis-regulatory elements, trans-acting factors, environmental factors, and DNA modification.

This variation in expression can be affected by modifier genes, epigenetic factors or the environment.

1. Modifier genes can alter the expression of other genes in either an additive or multiplicative way. Meaning the phenotype that is observed can be a result of two different alleles (gene variants) being summed or multiplied. However, a reduction in expression may also occur in which the primary locus, where the gene is located, is affected.
2. Epigenetic factors are heritable changes in the chromatin accessibility that affect the gene expression. Epigenetic factors can include:
  1. Cis-regulatory elements, which are regions of non-coding DNA that regulate transcription of genes, such as promoters or enhancers.
  2. Trans-regulatory elements, which are regulatory proteins, such as transcription factors (TFs) that bind to DNA to regulate gene expression.
  3. Histone modifications, which regulate the accessibility of chromatin for gene transcription.
  4. Chromatin variants, which are different states of chromatin.
  5. Genomic imprinting, which determines whether some genes inherited from the mother and father get expressed.
3. The expressivity of a gene can be influenced by the environmental conditions. For example, pigmentation in the fur of Himalayan rabbits is determined by the C gene, the activity of which is dependent on temperature. During rearing of genetically identical rabbits, if a rabbit’s fur reaches a temperature higher than 35 °C, the fur will develop as white. If a rabbit’s fur stays at a temperature between 15 and 25 °C, the fur will develop as black.

== Variable expressivity in plants and animals ==
=== Plants ===
Expressivity is commonly seen in plants and can be regulated by complex interactions between the environment, hormonal signalling, and genetics. An example of expressivity in plants caused by a rare gene is the variation in the number of branches. Initially identified in sorghum plants, this rare gene is called the Sorghum bicolor Axillary Branched Mutant (SbABM). Over several years of studies on SbABM in the rabi sorghum plant, researchers found that the progeny of the plants ranged from having 0 to 33 branches, even though they all had the same SbABM genotype.

=== Animals ===
A well-known example is polydactyly in Hemingway’s cats, which is the presence of extra toes. The number of extra toes can differ between cats, due to variable expressivity of the ZRS gene in the feline chromosome A2. ZRS enhances the activity of the SHH gene, which is involved in limb development, and this has been shown to cause extra toes. Although polydactyly is caused by an autosomal dominant allele, the variable expressivity (number of toes) of polydactyly in cats may be influenced by the tissues surrounding the region that would develop into toes.

== Clinical application ==
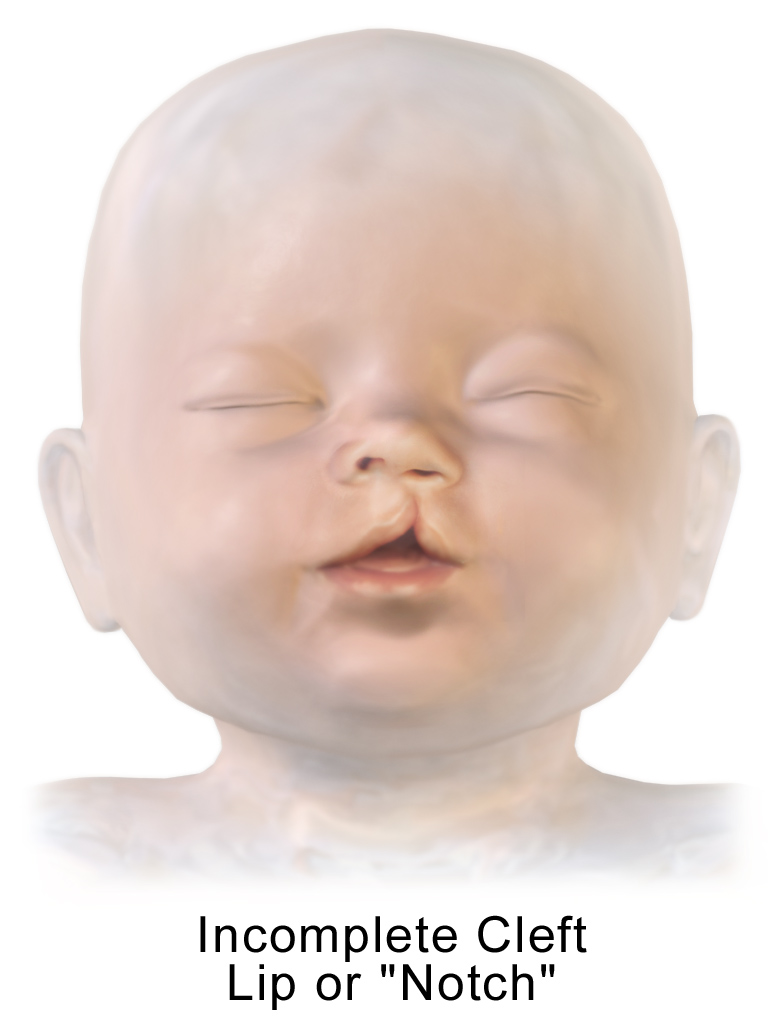
Figure 3. Example of Cleft lip seen as a result of the Van der Woude syndrome.

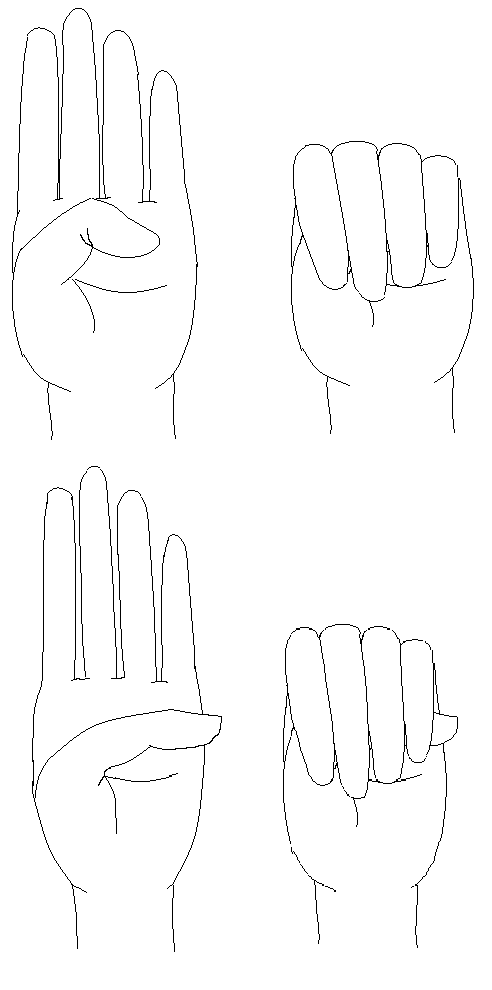
Figure 2. Individuals with Marfan syndrome usually have fingers that are longer than those that do not have the syndrome. The extremity of difference in finger length is a result of variable expressivity.

Some common syndromes that involved phenotypic variability due to expressivity include: Marfan syndrome, Van der Woude syndrome, and neurofibromatosis.

The characteristics of Marfan syndrome widely vary among individuals. The syndrome affects connective tissue in the body and has a spectrum of symptoms ranging from mild bone and joint involvement to severe newborn forms and cardiovascular disease. This diversity in symptoms is a result of variable expressivity of the FBN1 gene found on chromosome 15 (see figure 2). The gene product is involved in the proper assembly of microfibrils, which are structures found in connective tissues to provide support and elasticity. In Marfan patients, different levels of FBN1 mRNA and FBN1 expression levels were observed. These varying levels were not associated with either sex or age. Lower levels of mRNA expression were associated with a higher risk for ectopia lentis, the displacement of the crystalline lens of the eye, and pectus deformity, an abnormality of the chest muscle, indicating that variation in expression could be due to levels of expressivity and not genotype.

Van der Woude syndrome is a condition that affects the development of the face, specifically a cleft lip, cleft palate or both (see Figure 3). Carriers of the rare allele can also have pits near the centre of the lower lip which may appear to be wet due to the presence of salivary glands. The resulting phenotypes expressed varies significantly among individuals. This variation can range so broadly that a study published by the Department of Orthodontics at the University of Athens showed that some individuals were unaware that they possessed the genotype for this condition until they were tested.

Neurofibromatosis (NF1), also known as Von Recklinghausen disease, is a genetic disorder that is caused by a rare mutation in the neurofibromin gene (NF1) on chromosome 17. This loss of function mutation in the tumor suppressor gene can cause tumors on the nerves called neurofibromas. These appear as small bumps under the skin. It is stipulated that the phenotypic variation is a result of genetic modifiers.

Some hemoglobinopathies (diseases of the blood) like Sickle Cell Anemia exist on a spectrum. Sickle Cell Anemia is an autosomal recessive, prototypical monogenic Mendelian disease, meaning that the disease follows Mendelian inheritance and is traced back to a single gene. Individuals with Sickle Cell Anemia present different severities of symptoms. Fetal Hemoglobin (HbF) concentration and the presence of alpha-thalassemia, a genetic blood disease in which the alpha globin subunit of the hemoglobin protein is underproduced, are thought to be major contributors to the genetic modification leading to the variable expressivity of hemolysis (destruction of red blood cells) and increasing the severity of the disease.

== See also ==
- Anticipation
- Pleiotropy
- Mendelian inheritance
- Genetic heterogeneity
- Haploinsufficiency
