= Major gene =

Major gene is a gene with pronounced phenotype expression, in contrast to a modifier gene. Major gene characterizes common expression of oligogenic series, i.e. a small number of genes that determine the same trait.

Major genes control the discontinuous or qualitative characters in contrast of minor genes or polygenes with individually small effects. Major genes segregate and may be easily subject to mendelian analysis. The gene categorization into major and minor determinants is more or less arbitrary. Both of the two types are in all probability only end points in a more or less continuous series of gene action and gene interactions.

The term major gene was introduced into the science of inheritance by Keneth Mather (1941).

== See also ==
- Gene interaction
- Minor gene
- Gene
