= Oligogenic inheritance =

Phenotypic trait influenced by a few genes

Oligogenic inheritance (Greek ὀλίγος – ὀligos = few, a little) describes a trait that is influenced by a few genes. Oligogenic inheritance represents an intermediate between monogenic inheritance in which a trait is determined by a single causative gene, and polygenic inheritance, in which a trait is influenced by many genes and often environmental factors.

Historically, many traits were thought to be governed by a single causative gene (in what is deemed monogenic inheritance), however work in genetics revealed that these traits are comparatively rare, and in most cases so-called monogenic traits are predominantly influenced by one gene, but can be mediated by other genes of small effect.

== History ==
Around the 1930s/40s, evidence that multiple genes could affect the risk of disease that showed discrete inheritance patterns, due to differences in the age of onset of disease for siblings. The age of onset for sibling pairs was very similar, but between pairs of siblings could be quite different, and would in some cases cluster into several age brackets. This suggested a major gene that controlled the risk for a disease, and other genes that impacted age of onset.

The recognition of diseases which were influenced by more than one gene highlighted a need to develop methodologies for detecting these oligogenic inheritance patterns, as they did not fit the more straightforward Mendelian model of inheritance. The developments of such methods accelerated the discovery of other examples of oligogenic traits, and sparked a change in the way genetic disease was perceived.

== Modifier genes ==
One example of oligogenic inheritance is a case where one gene is sufficient to cause a trait, however its penetrance or expressivity is influenced by another gene, called a modifier. An example of such a case is the gene TGFB1 which modified a person's risk of developing Alzheimer's disease if they are carrying the disease variant of the gene APP. The mechanism is thought to work through the modifier variant increasing the clearance of amyloid fibers in the aging brain, reducing plaque burden.

== Identification of oligogenic traits ==
A trait can be recognised as oligogenic through the following lines of evidence:

- Phenotype–genotype correlations: if phenotype can't be predicted to a single strongly correlated locus, but inclusion of genotype from another locus improves the correlation, this is evidence for the trait being oligogenic
- Phenotypic differences in an animal model of the disease that are dependent on the genetic background: the effects of a potential modifier locus can be tested in an animal with another known causative mutation
- Disparities between mutations and a Mendelian model of inheritance: if carriers of a mutation do not show the pattern of phenotypes expected under Mendelian inheritance, other models may better explain observed patterns of inheritance
- The establishment of linkage to more than one locus or the failure to detect linkage using Mendelian models: when tracing mutations associated with a trait through a family tree, more than one mutation may show the same pattern of inheritance as the trait (in a case where multiple variants are required for a trait), or linkage may not be detected (in a case where one of several variants is sufficient for a trait)

== Human properties with possible oligogenic inheritance ==
Dominant	Recessive	References
Widow's peak	Straight frontal hair line	
Facial dimples *	No facial dimples	
Able to taste PTC	Unable to taste PTC	
Unattached (free) earlobe	Attached earlobe	
Clockwise hair direction (left to right)	Counter-clockwise hair direction (right to left)	
Cleft chin	Smooth chin	
Ability to roll tongue (Able to hold tongue in a U shape)	No ability to roll tongue	
Extra finger or toe	Normal five fingers and toes	
Straight thumb	Hitchhiker's thumb	
Freckles	No freckles	
Wet-type earwax	Dry-type earwax	
Shortness in fingers	Normal finger length	
Webbed fingers	Normal separated fingers	
Roman nose	No prominent bridge	
Marfan's syndrome	Normal body proportions	
Huntington's disease	No nerve damage	
Normal mucous lining	Cystic fibrosis	
Forged chin	Receding chin	
White forelock	Dark forelock	
Ligamentous angustus	Ligamentous laxity	
Ability to eat sugar	Galactosemia	
Total leukonychia and Bart pumphrey syndrome	Partial leukonychia	
Absence of fish-like body odour	Trimethylaminuria	
Lactose persistence *	Lactose intolerance *	
Prominent chin (V-shaped)	Less prominent chin (U-shaped)	

== See also ==
- Gene
- Monogenic inheritance
- Polygenic inheritance
