= Locus heterogeneity =

Locus heterogeneity occurs when mutations at multiple genomic loci are capable of producing the same phenotype (ie. a single trait, pattern of traits, or disorder), and each individual mutation is sufficient to cause the specific phenotype independently. Locus heterogeneity should not be confused with allelic heterogeneity, in which a single phenotype can be produced by multiple mutations, all of which are at the same locus on a chromosome. Likewise, it should not be confused with phenotypic heterogeneity, in which different phenotypes arise among organisms with identical genotypes and environmental conditions. Locus heterogeneity and allelic heterogeneity are the two components of genetic heterogeneity.

Locus heterogeneity may have major implications for a number of human diseases. For instance, it has been associated with retinitis pigmentosa, hypertrophic cardiomyopathy, osteogenesis imperfecta, familial hypercholesterolemia, and hearing loss. Heterogenous loci involved in formation of the same phenotype often contribute to similar biological pathways. The role and degree of locus heterogeneity is an important consideration in understanding disease phenotypes and in the development of therapeutic treatment for these diseases.

The detection of causal genes for diseases impacted by locus heterogeneity is difficult with genetic analysis methods such as linkage analysis and genome sequencing. These methods rely on comparison of affected family members, but when different family members have different disease-causing genes, such genes may not be accurately identified. Existing techniques have been modified and new techniques have been developed to overcome these challenges.

== Retinitis pigmentosa ==
Retinitis pigmentosa is a condition that causes damage to the light-sensitive cells of the retina. There have been over 60 genes identified whose mutations independently cause retinitis pigmentosa, and these can be inherited in an autosomal dominant, autosomal recessive, or X-linked pattern. Examples of such genes include the rhodopsin gene (RHO), the gene encoding for retinitis pigmentosa GTPase regulator (RGPR), and the gene encoding retinitis pigmentosa 2 protein (RP2).

== See also ==
- Allelic heterogeneity
- List of cutaneous conditions caused by mutations in keratins
