= Genetic heterogeneity =

Different genetic causes for the same disease

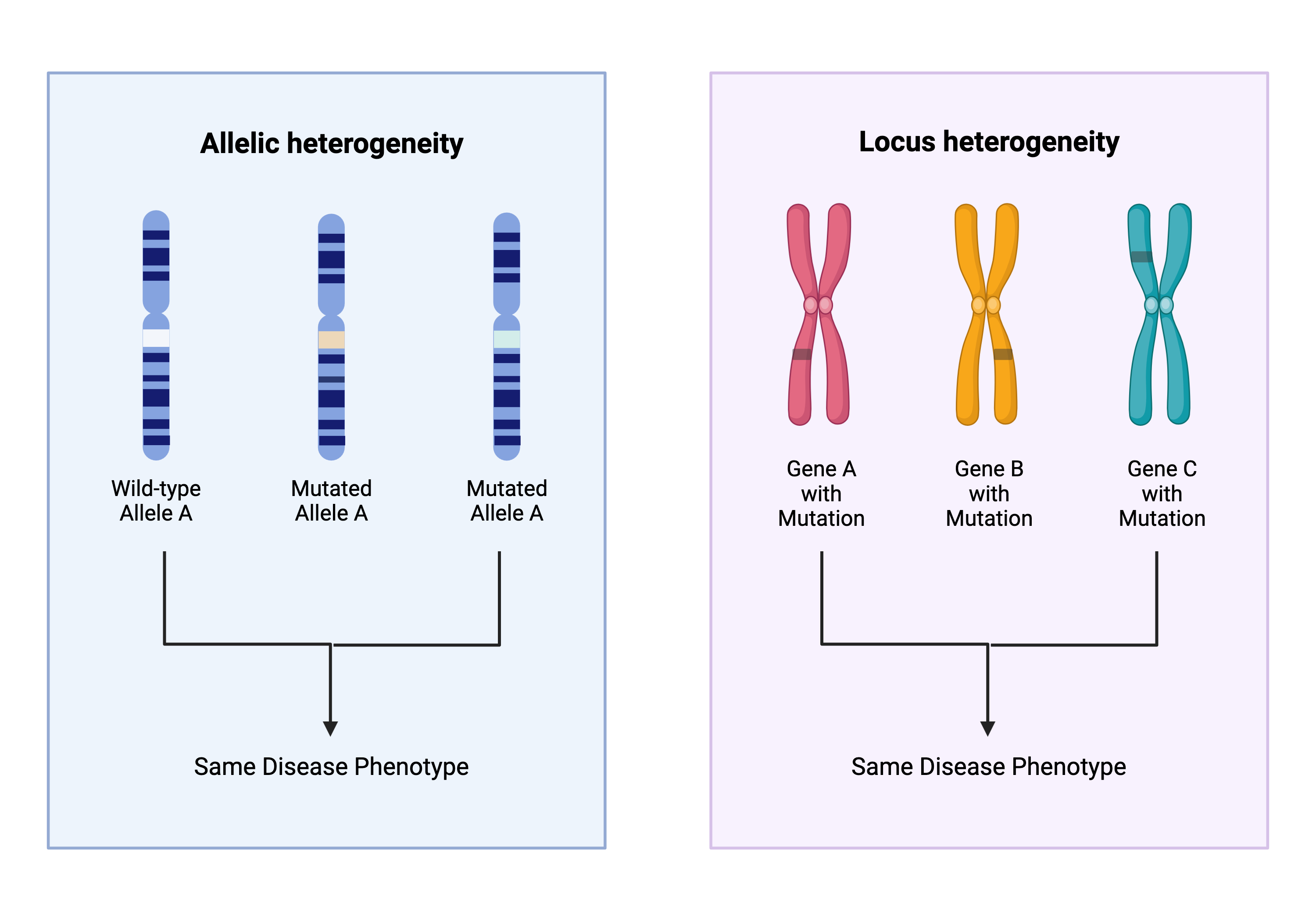

Genetic heterogeneity refers to different genetic causes for the same disease and can be classified into three types: allelic heterogeneity, locus heterogeneity, and phenotypic heterogeneity. Allelic heterogeneity occurs when different mutations within the same gene lead to the same disease. For example, multiple mutations in the CFTR gene cause cystic fibrosis. Locus heterogeneity arises when mutations in different genes cause the same disorder. In retinitis pigmentosa, mutations in several genes, like RHO and PRPF31, can all lead to the same disease. Lastly, phenotypic heterogeneity refers to the variation in disease expression, where individuals with the same genetic mutation may present with different clinical symptoms or severities. An example is Marfan syndrome, where mutations in the FBN1 gene result in a wide range of manifestations, from mild to severe. These variations highlight the complexity of genetic diseases and affect diagnosis and treatment.

== Role in disease ==
At the molecular level, human disease exhibits extensive genetic heterogeneity, more than previously recognized. Studies on various common diseases highlight that this heterogeneity influences disease causation in multiple ways. Rare mutations, though individually uncommon, collectively contribute to complex disorders. A single gene may contain numerous distinct mutations, each affecting different individuals, while the same mutation can lead to varying clinical symptoms due to genetic and environmental factors. Additionally, mutations in different genes within the same biological pathway can produce similar diseases.

Beyond mutation accumulation and genomic instability, selection pressure also plays a crucial role in shaping genetic heterogeneity in disease. Some genetic variants that increase disease risk persist in populations due to historical advantages. For example, the sickle cell allele (HbS) remains prevalent in malaria-endemic regions because it provides resistance to the disease. This interplay between evolution and disease further complicates gene discovery and the development of personalized treatments.

== Evolutionary impact ==
Genetic heterogeneity is a driving force in evolution, playing a key role in adaptation and natural selection. It refers to the variety of genetic differences present within a population, which is crucial for a species' ability to adapt to changing environments. When genetic variation exists, natural selection can act on it, favoring individuals with advantageous traits that increase their chances of survival and reproduction. Over time, these beneficial traits become more common within the population, driving evolutionary change. Heterogeneity also allows for a broader range of responses to selective pressures, such as environmental shifts or new diseases, ensuring that some individuals will possess traits that enable them to thrive. Without genetic diversity, a population would be more vulnerable to extinction as it would have fewer options for adapting to new challenges. In essence, genetic heterogeneity fuels the process of natural selection by providing the raw material for adaptation and the evolution of species.

== Tumor Heterogeneity ==
=== Intra-Tumor vs. Inter-Tumor Heterogeneity ===
Tumor heterogeneity is directly linked to genetic heterogeneity, as genetic variations drive the diversity seen within and between tumors.

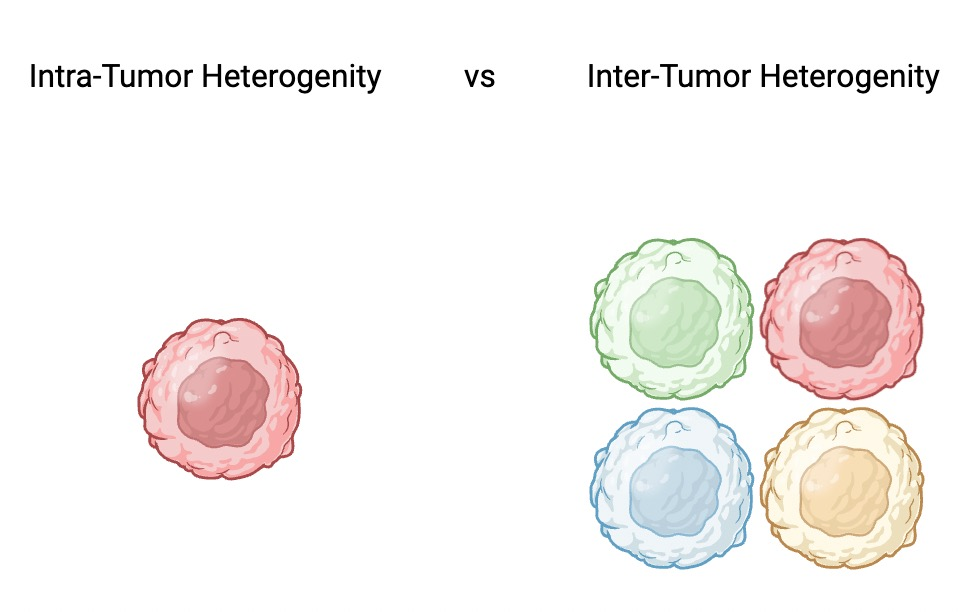

Intra-tumor heterogeneity arises from genetic heterogeneity within a single tumor, meaning different cancer cells within the same tumor may have distinct genetic mutations. This results from ongoing genetic instability, where cells accumulate new mutations over time, leading to diverse subpopulations with different growth rates, drug resistance, and metastatic potential. This genetic diversity makes treatment challenging because some cells may survive therapy while others die.

Inter-tumor heterogeneity, on the other hand, reflects genetic heterogeneity between tumors, meaning that tumors from different patients (or even different tumors within the same patient) can have completely different genetic mutations. This occurs due to differences in inherited genetic backgrounds, environmental exposures, and the specific tissues where tumors originate. Since tumors have unique genetic profiles, a treatment effective for one patient may not work for another, emphasizing the need for personalized medicine.

=== Impact on Treatment ===
Tumor heterogeneity, the genetic and phenotypic diversity within and between tumors, poses significant challenges in cancer treatment, particularly in drug resistance and personalized medicine. Intra-tumor heterogeneity leads to drug resistance, as tumors consist of diverse cancer cell subpopulations with different mutations. When chemotherapy or targeted therapy is applied, some cells may be eliminated, while resistant ones survive and continue growing. This presents a constant challenge for cancer treatment, as the tumor evolves over time, and resistance mutations emerge, making previously effective treatments ineffective. Inter-tumor heterogeneity complicates personalized medicine, as patients with the same type of cancer may have vastly different tumor genetic profiles. Precision medicine relies on genetic sequencing to tailor treatments, but a single biopsy may not capture the full genetic complexity of a tumor. This can result in incomplete treatment strategies, as different regions of the tumor may harbor distinct mutations, reducing the effectiveness of targeted therapies. Understanding tumor heterogeneity is essential for developing more precise and adaptable treatments, ensuring that therapies are not only effective against the tumor's current state but also account for its dynamic nature

=== Techniques to Study Tumor Heterogeneity ===
==== 1. Single-Cell Sequencing ====
Single-cell sequencing (scRNA-seq and scDNA-seq) allows for the analysis of individual cells' genomic and transcriptomic profiles, overcoming the limitations of bulk sequencing which masks minority subpopulations. This technique reveals differences in gene expression, mutations, and epigenetic modifications across single tumor cells, enabling the reconstruction of clonal evolution and identification of rare resistant subclones. It has been instrumental in identifying subtypes of tumor-infiltrating immune cells and in tracking lineage relationships during metastasis.

==== 2. Imaging Techniques ====
Advanced imaging methods, such as multiplex immunohistochemistry, fluorescence in situ hybridization (FISH), and multiplexed ion beam imaging (MIBI), allow spatial visualization of tumor heterogeneity. These approaches provide context about how different cell populations are organized within the tumor microenvironment and how they interact. Emerging modalities like imaging mass cytometry and spatial transcriptomics integrate molecular data with high-resolution tissue architecture.

==== 3. Biomarker Analysis ====
Biomarker profiling, using techniques like liquid biopsy (e.g., circulating tumor DNA or ctDNA), can capture tumor-derived genetic material shed into blood or other body fluids, providing a non-invasive snapshot of tumor heterogeneity. This is especially useful for monitoring treatment response and emerging resistance in real time. However, the sensitivity and specificity of such biomarkers depend on the tumor's mutation burden and shedding rates.

== Cellular and Microbial Heterogeneity ==
Genetic heterogeneity can occur at cellular and microbial levels, where differences in gene expression contribute to variations in biological processes. These differences can influence cellular function, microbial survival, and applications in biotechnology. Even genetically identical microbial populations can exhibit heterogeneity, where individual cells respond differently to environmental factors. Advances in genome-wide analyses and cost-effective Next-Generation Sequencing (NGS) have provided greater insight into the extent of cellular heterogeneity.

=== Variability in Gene Expression ===
Gene expression can vary among individual cells in a tissue, even in genetically identical populations. Factors such as stochastic processes, epigenetic modifications, and environmental influences contribute to this variability. Single-cell RNA sequencing has revealed differences in transcriptional activity that may play a role in processes such as cell differentiation and tumor development.

Heterogeneity in gene expression can arise due to multiple factors:

- Extrinsic heterogeneity results from environmental influences such as cell-cycle stage and cell size, leading to phenotypic plasticity in response to changing conditions.
- Intrinsic heterogeneity arises from stochastic gene expression, where random fluctuations in transcription and translation cause variability in protein abundance among cells.
- Directed heterogeneity involves regulatory mechanisms such as epigenetics, alternative splicing, and post-translational modifications that shape cellular diversity in a controlled manner.
- Non-genetic heterogeneity contributes to developmental processes, such as the differentiation of pluripotent stem cells. RNA modifications can influence cellular responses to diseases and infections.

In the nervous system, heterogeneity is observed in mitochondrial distribution within neurons, varying by region and cellular energy demands.

=== Microbial Adaptation and Resistance ===
Microbial populations can exhibit heterogeneity in gene expression, leading to variations in traits such as antibiotic resistance. Some bacterial subpopulations may persist despite antibiotic treatment due to differences in gene regulation, a phenomenon relevant to research on antimicrobial resistance and microbial ecology.

Heterogeneity in microbial populations can serve as a survival strategy:

- Bet-hedging allows a population to maintain individuals with diverse traits, increasing the likelihood of survival under changing conditions.
- Similar principles apply to tumor heterogeneity, where genetic and epigenetic variations contribute to treatment resistance.
- In microbial systems, heterogeneity may enhance population robustness, aiding in bacterial persistence under stress.

=== Applications in Biotechnology ===
Understanding cellular heterogeneity has applications in biotechnology, including tissue engineering, regenerative medicine, and synthetic biology. Strategies to control or leverage gene expression variability are being explored for optimizing microbial systems and developing engineered tissues. Advances in single-cell analysis techniques have enhanced research in these areas.

Heterogeneity is increasingly recognized as a factor in bioprocess optimization:

- While initially viewed as a challenge due to its potential to reduce process efficiency, heterogeneity is now being studied for its potential benefits in bioprocess engineering.
- Mechanical stress has been used to manipulate fungal morphologies for improved productivity, and similar approaches may apply to microbial population management.
- Microfluidic systems facilitate the controlled study of single-cell behavior, offering insights into population heterogeneity and bioreactor inhomogeneity, which are important for industrial bioprocess development.

== History of Genetic Heterogeneity ==
The concept of genetic heterogeneity has evolved significantly over the past century, paralleling advances in molecular genetics, genomics, and disease biology. Genetic heterogeneity refers to the phenomenon where a single phenotype or disease can be caused by variations in different genes (locus heterogeneity) or different mutations within the same gene (allelic heterogeneity).

=== Early Recognition in Mendelian Genetics ===
The recognition of genetic heterogeneity dates back to early studies in Mendelian inheritance. In the early 20th century, researchers observed that similar phenotypes could be inherited in different patterns within families, suggesting distinct genetic causes. One of the earliest formal recognitions came from Archibald Garrod's work on inborn errors of metabolism in the early 1900s. He hypothesized that various biochemical disorders could result from different inherited enzymatic defects, laying the groundwork for understanding biochemical and genetic diversity.

=== Discovery Through Rare Diseases ===
By the mid-20th century, genetic heterogeneity became a critical concept in medical genetics. The study of rare hereditary diseases like retinitis pigmentosa and osteogenesis imperfecta revealed that patients with clinically similar presentations could have mutations in completely different genes. These findings introduced the formal distinction between locus heterogeneity and allelic heterogeneity, helping clinicians and researchers better classify and diagnose genetic disorders.

For example, retinitis pigmentosa, a degenerative eye disease, was found to be caused by mutations in more than 60 different genes, demonstrating extreme locus heterogeneity. Similarly, cystic fibrosis is caused by mutations in the CFTR gene, but over 2,000 different variants (allelic heterogeneity) have been identified in affected individuals.

=== Molecular and Genomic Era ===
With the advent of molecular cloning in the 1970s and Sanger sequencing in the 1980s, researchers could directly identify mutations responsible for various inherited diseases, confirming the widespread existence of both allelic and locus heterogeneity at the molecular level.

The completion of the Human Genome Project (2003) and subsequent development of next-generation sequencing (NGS) revolutionized the detection of genetic heterogeneity. Techniques such as whole-exome sequencing (WES) and whole-genome sequencing (WGS) allowed researchers to detect rare and common variants across many genes simultaneously, accelerating the discovery of new disease-associated genes and variants.

These technologies led to a deeper understanding of the genetic architecture of complex diseases like autism spectrum disorders, schizophrenia, and various cancers, which often involve hundreds of contributing loci with varying degrees of penetrance and interaction.

== Environmental Heterogeneity ==
Environmental heterogeneity refers to the degree of genetic variation that accumulates in an environment due across space and time which contributes to the function and diversity of an ecosystem and its species. Spatial heterogeneity refers to differences across locations whereas temporal heterogeneity depicts how changes over time influence an ecosystem's heterogeneity. This includes both short-term seasonal changes and long-term, generational shifts in land and vegetation.

=== Drivers of Spatial and Temporal Heterogeneity ===
Spatial heterogeneity is influenced by global environmental changes such as natural disasters, pollution, and chemical abundance. Temporal heterogeneity occurs due to factors such as seasonal changes, ecological succession, and natural disturbances. For example, temperature and precipitation fluctuate seasonally which will affect factors important for survival and reproduction such as nutrient availability and migration patterns. The degree of spatial and temporal variation serves as an indicator of an ecosystem's ability to withstand or adapt to natural disturbances. The extent to which global events impact an ecosystem's variability depends on their severity, the spatial distribution of their effects, and the rate at which they occur. These factors influence how quickly an ecosystem can respond to environmental changes.

=== Ecosystem Survival and Resilience ===
The level of spatial and temporal heterogeneity in an ecosystem affects survival by influencing nutrient movement, accessibility, and availability. As the geographic scale and time span being considered increase, so does the potential for diversity and greater heterogeneity, ultimately supporting higher biodiversity. A heterogeneous environment provides access to a wider range of resources across a larger area, creating potential for suitable living conditions for numerous species.

Environmental heterogeneity is linked to species persistence in unfavorable conditions. Prolonged exposure to significant environmental variation promotes tolerance to suboptimal living conditions, reducing the overall rate of species extinction.

Ecological variance allows for the potential of niche construction. In doing so, this reduces the degree of selection pressures and competition between species, thus promoting co-existence among species. Environmental heterogeneity promotes ecological interaction among species which contributes to the stability of an ecosystem, ultimately increasing likelihood of survival.

== Examples of Genetic Heterogeneity in Common Conditions ==
=== Cystic Fibrosis ===
Cystic fibrosis is an inherited autosomal recessive genetic disorder that occurs through a mutation in a single gene that codes for the cystic fibrosis transmembrane conductance regulator. Research has identified over 2,000 cystic fibrosis associated mutations in the gene encoding for the cystic fibrosis transmembrane conductance regulator at varying degrees of frequency within the disease carrying population. These mutations also produce varying degrees of disease phenotypes, and may also work in combinations to produce additive phenotypic effects.

=== Alzheimer's disease ===
Alzheimer's disease is a complicated neurodegenerative disorder with multiple phenotypic subtypes, including clinical and preclinical, that result from different genetic origins. Current research on the amyloid cascade hypothesis has identified rare mutations in three genes that encode the amyloid precursor protein (APP), presenilin 1 (PS-1), and presenilin 2 (PS-2) that cause the autosomal dominant, early-onset form of familial Alzheimer's disease. Research has also discovered the association of a fourth allele, apolipoprotein E4 (ApoE4), in the development of late-onset and sporadic forms of the disease, although the pathology of its role is still largely unknown.

=== Inherited predisposition to breast cancer ===
Mutations in ten different genes have been found to contribute to a heritable increased risk of breast cancer and other cancer syndromes. These genes, when functional, contribute to a pathway that serves to preserve genomic integrity. Mutations in BRCA1 and BRCA2 result in a high risk of both breast and ovarian cancers. Mutations in p53 and PTEN increase risks of breast cancer associated with rare cancer syndromes. Mutations in CHEK2, ATM, NBS1, RAD50, BRIP1, and PALB2 can double the risk of breast cancer development. Biallelic mutations, in which both copies of a particular gene are mutated, in BRCA2, BRIP1, and PALB2 also cause Fanconi anemia, a recessive syndrome that leads to progressive bone marrow failure.
