= Allelic heterogeneity =

Phenomenon in which different mutations at the same locus cause the same phenotype

Allelic heterogeneity is the phenomenon in which different mutations at the same locus lead to the same or very similar phenotypes. These allelic variations can arise as a result of natural selection processes, as a result of exogenous mutagens, genetic drift, or genetic migration. Many of these mutations take the form of single nucleotide polymorphisms in which a single nucleotide base is altered compared to a consensus sequence. They can also exist as copy number variants (CNV) in which the copies of a gene or DNA sequence is different from the population.

Mutated alleles expressing allelic heterogeneity can be classified as adaptive or disadaptive. These mutations can occur in the germ line cells, somatic cells, or in the mitochondrial. Mutations in germ line cells can be inherited as well as mitochondrial allelic mutations. The mitochondrial allelic mutations are inherited maternally. Typically in the human genome a small amount of allele variants account for ~75% of the mutations found at a particular locus within a population. Other variants found are considered to be rare or exclusive to a single pedigree. The Online Mendelian Inheritance of Man has a record of over 1000 genes and their associated allelic variants. These genes display allelic heterogeneity at their loci and are responsible for distinct disease phenotypes. Some of these diseases include alkaptonuria, albinism, achondroplasia, and phenylketonuria. For example, β-thalassemia may be caused by several different mutations in the β-globin gene. Allelic heterogeneity should not be confused with locus heterogeneity in which a mutation at a different gene causes a similar phenotype. Nor should it be confused with phenotypic heterogeneity in which a mutation within the same gene causes a different phenotype. Other major diseases displaying allelic heterogeneity are allelic mutations in the dystrophin gene which cause Duchenne dystrophy and mutations in the CFTR gene that are known to causes cystic fibrosis.

== Alkaptonuria ==
The human gene for the HGD nucleotide sequence shows a number of AKU-causing allelic mutations. Approximately 40 different allelic variants have been documented. Most of these variants do not have an effect on the enzyme catalysis function. A few known alleles have an indirect effect on protein function by causing misfolding and disrupt the proper assembly of the enzyme complex. Alkaptunoria is considered to be a classic example of allelic heterogeneity showing a single variant in the human phenotype.

== See also ==
- Locus heterogeneity
