= Phenotypic heterogeneity =

Phenotypic heterogeneity describes different mutations in the same gene that can sometimes give rise to strikingly different phenotypes.

E.g., certain loss-of-function mutations in the RET gene, which encodes a receptor tyrosine kinase, can cause dominantly inherited failure of development of colonic ganglia, leading to defective colonic motility and severe chronic constipation (Hirschsprung disease).
